This is a list of aviation-related events from 2014.

Deadliest crash
The deadliest crash of this year was Malaysia Airlines Flight 17, a Boeing 777 which was shot down on 17 July near Hrabove, Ukraine, killing all 298 people on board; it is the deadliest airliner shoot-down in aviation history. Flight 17 also marked the deadliest plane crash of the 2010s decade, and not withstanding the September 11 attacks, it is the deadliest aviation crash of the 21st century.

Events

January
1 January
 To express his patriotic support for the People's Republic of Chinas claim to the Diaoyu Islands – also claimed by Japan as the Senkaku Islands – Chinese balloonist Xu Shuaijun attempts to fly his hot-air balloon from Fujian Province, China, to the islands. After nearly 7½ hours in the air, he encounters severe air turbulence, his balloon malfunctions, and he is forced down in the East China Sea  from the islands. A Japan Coast Guard ship picks him up unharmed and transfers him to a Chinese patrol ship.
 Syrian Air Force aircraft conduct a cross-border strike into Lebanon, bombing barren hills in the Jroud Arsal area which Syrian refugees and rebels use to move between the two countries. The raid kills or injures 10 Syrians.

2 January
 A helicopter from the Chinese icebreaking research vessel Xuě Lóng rescues 52 passengers aboard the Russian research ship MV Akademik Shokalskiy – trapped by thick sea ice off Cape De la Motte, George V Land, Antarctica, since 24 December 2013 – and carries them 12 at a time to the Australian icebreaker Aurora Australis. Akademik Shokalskiys 22 crew members remain behind to await a chance to free their ship. A previous attempt by Xuě Lóng to rescue Akademik Shokalskiys passengers on 28 December 2013 had failed.

6 January
 A Singapore Airlines Airbus A380 with 494 people on board makes an emergency landing in Baku, Azerbaijan, due to cabin depressurization while en route from London to Singapore. There are no injuries, but oxygen masks deploy.

7 January
 The Iraqi Air Force strikes a rebel operations center on the outskirts of Ramadi, Iraq. According to Iraqi officials, the strike kills 25 al-Qaeda militants.
 A Sikorsky HH-60 Pave Hawk helicopter from the United States Air Forces 48th Fighter Wing crashes at a nature reserve in Cley next the Sea, United Kingdom, killing all four people on board.

8 January
 The Russian Federal Air Transport Agency bans liquids in hand luggage in the countrys airports until 1 April 2014, requiring them to be placed in checked baggage instead.

9 January
 Kenyan aircraft strike Garbahaareey, Somalia, killing 30 al-Shabaab members.

10 January 
 In Jakarta, Indonesia, Halim Perdanakusuma Airport resumes service of scheduled flights after a hiatus of almost 29 years to relieve overcrowding at the city's main airport, Soekarno–Hatta International Airport. It is the first time since the opening of Soekarno–Hatta International in March 1985 that Halim Perdanakusuma Airport has handled anything other than charter and military flights and general aviation.
It is the highest altitude SpaceshipTwo has reached thus far.

12 January
 Thinking that they are landing at Branson Airport in Branson, Missouri, the pilots of Southwest Airlines Flight 4103, a Boeing 737-700 with 129 people on board, mistakenly land at M. Graham Clark Downtown Airport  to the northwest. The 737 takes off safely the following day.

19 January
 An Israeli Air Force aircraft fires a missile at Ahmad Saad as he rides his motorcycle in the Gaza Strip in Israels first targeted killing attempt there since April 2013. Israel claims that Saad is a Palestinian Islamic Jihad operative who specializes in the launching of rockets and was responsible for five rockets launched from the Gaza Strip at Ashkelon, Israel, on 16 January. The Israeli missile strike injures Saad and a 12-year-old boy.

20 January
 Pakistani aircraft begin strikes against targets in North Waziristan. The strikes continue into 21 January, reportedly killing 40 suspected Pakistani Taliban militants.
 A Romanian Superior School of Aviation Britten-Norman BN-2A-27 Islander registered YR-BNP and carrying an organ-harvesting medical team, crashes in bad weather in the Apuseni Mountains in Romania during a domestic flight from Bucharest to Oradea, killing two of the seven people on board.

22 January
 An Israeli Air Force aircraft fires a missile into Beit Hanoun in the northeastern Gaza Strip, killing Popular Front for the Liberation of Palestine member Ahmed Zaanin and his cousin, Islamic Jihad Movement in Palestine member Mohammed Zaanin.

23 January
 Five men finally are indicted for the robbery on 11 December 1978 of the Lufthansa cargo handling area at John F. Kennedy International Airport in New York, New York.

25 January
 Islamic militants shoot down an Egyptian military helicopter in the northern Sinai Peninsula with a shoulder-launched surface-to-air missile, killing all five of its crew members. The Ansar Bait al-Maqdis group claims responsibility.

26 January
 An American unmanned aerial vehicle conducts a missile strike against a car in the village of Hawai in the Lower Shabelle region of Somalia, killing al-Shabaab commander Sahal Iskudhuq.

30–31 January (overnight)
 Egyptian Apache attack helicopters fire dozens of missiles at houses, shops, vehicles, and other targets in Sheikh Zuweyid in Egypts Sinai Peninsula, reportedly killing 13 suspected members of the Islamic militant group Ansar Beit al-Maqdis.

February
 A few days after the Washington Nationals begin using an unmanned aerial vehicle (UAV) to film their spring training activities in Viera, Florida, for use on the scoreboard at Nationals Park in Washington, D.C., during the regular Major League Baseball season, the U.S. Federal Aviation Administration orders them to stop. The FAA determines that the flights violate its ban on the use of UAVs for commercial purposes.

1 February
 Syrian military helicopters drop "barrel bombs" – barrels packed with explosives, fuel, and debris capable of leveling residential buildings – on rebel-held areas in and around Aleppo, killing 13 people in the Al-Bab District and at least 10 more elsewhere in the Aleppo area.

4 February
 Syrian aircraft drop barrel bombs on five Aleppo neighborhoods, killing at least five people.

5 February
 Merpati Nusantara Airlines ceases flight operations due to financial problems.
 More than 700 people have died in Aleppo since 22 January, the vast majority of them civilians killed in barrel-bomb attacks by Syrian aircraft. One estimate places the death toll at 1,242.

7 February
 A man attempts to hijack a Pegasus Airlines flight from Ukraine, saying he has a bomb on board and demanding to be flown to Sochi, Russia, the host city of the 2014 Winter Olympics, which had begun the previous day. The pilots turn off the in-flight monitors and land at Sabiha Gökçen Airport in Istanbul, Turkey, fooling the man into thinking he was landing in Sochi. The plane, a Boeing 737-800, is escorted to Istanbul by two Turkish Air Force F-16 Fighting Falcon fighters. The man, apparently severely intoxicated, is detained by police and taken to the Istanbul Security Headquarters.

11 February
 Myanma Airways (the future Myanmar National Airlines) signs the largest single aircraft order in the history of Myanmar (known until 1989 as Burma). The $960 million order with GECAS for six Boeing 737-800 and four Boeing 737 MAX airliners is the largest sale to Myanmar (or Burma) by a U.S. company in decades.
 An Algerian Air Force Lockheed C-130 Hercules transport aircraft carrying Algerian military personnel and their families crashes in bad weather into Djebel Fertas mountain near Aïn Kercha, Oum El Bouaghi Province, Algeria, killing 77 of the 78 people on board.

16 February
 Nepal Airlines Flight 183, a de Havilland Canada DHC-6 Twin Otter, crashes into a hill at Dhikura, Nepal, during a domestic flight to Jumla from Pokhara Airport, killing all 18 people on board.

17 February
 Hailemedhin Abera Tegegn, the co-pilot of Ethiopian Airlines Flight 702 – a Boeing 767-3BGER with 202 people on board bound from Addis Ababa, Ethiopia, to Rome, Italy – locks the cockpit door while the pilot is out of the cockpit to use the toilet and flies the plane to Geneva, Switzerland, where he uses a rope to climb from the cockpit window to the runway. He surrenders to authorities and requests asylum.
 The 748 Air Services Hawker Siddeley HS 748 5Y-HAJ, chartered by the International Organization for Migration on a humanitarian aid cargo flight in South Sudan from Juba International Airport in Juba to Bentiu, touches down too fast at Bentiu Airport, veers off the runway, and crashes. The aircraft runs across a ditch and strikes two parked vehicles, breaks up, and catches fire, killing one of the four people on board. It is the first civil aviation accident in South Sudan since the country became independent from Sudan in 2011.

19–20 February (overnight)
 Pakistani jet fighters and attack helicopters strike Islamic militant hideouts in six locations in the Mir Ali area of North Waziristan, Pakistan, and in Nullah and Yousaf Talab in the Bara Tehsil of the Khyber Agency. Estimates of the number of militants killed in the strikes range from 15 to at least 35.

23 February
 Pakistani airstrikes kill at least 38 Islamic militants and destroy six of their hideouts in the Tirah Valley in Pakistans Khyber Agency.

24 February
 Israeli Air Force aircraft conduct two strikes in Lebanon in the eastern Bekaa Valley along the Israeli border near the Lebanese villages of Janta and Yahfoufa, targeting what a human-rights activist group describes as a Hezbollah "rocket launcher."

25 February
 Pakistani aircraft carry out early morning airstrikes in South Waziristan and in the Shawal valley and Dattakhel areas of North Waziristan, Pakistan, reportedly killing at least 30 people which Pakistani security officials describe as terrorists.

26 February
 A Piper PA-31 Navajo crashes in Hawaii, killing three of the six people aboard.

27 February
 Pakistan conducts its first airstrike against targets in the settled area of Khyber Pakhtunkhwa as attack helicopters strike Islamic militants in Kulachi Tehsil in the Dera Ismail Khan District, killing three suspected militants.
 After three months of civil unrest in Ukraine result in the ouster of Ukrainian President Viktor Yanukovych, Russia places fighter aircraft along the border with Ukraine, and Russian fighters begin flying continual patrols along the border.

28 February
 Unidentified armed men wearing unmarked Russian-style military uniforms take control of Simferopol International Airport and Belbek Airport, both on the Crimean Peninsula in Ukraine.
 Approximately 10 Russian Ilyushin Il-76 (NATO reporting name "Candid") military transport aircraft fly about 2,000 Russian troops through Ukrainian airspace without Ukrainian government permission, disembarking them at a military base at Gvardiysky, Ukraine.
 Ukraine reports that eleven Russian military helicopters have flown over the Crimean Peninsula without Ukrainian government permission.
 At nightfall, Ukraines national airline, Ukraine International Airlines, is denied access to airports on the Crimean Peninsula, and the airspace over the peninsula is declared closed.

March

5 March
 The United States announces that it will increase joint training by United States Air Force F-16 Fighting Falcon and C-130 Hercules aircraft with the Polish Air Force to demonstrate the commitment of the North Atlantic Treaty Organization (NATO) to the defense of Poland during the Crimean crisis in Ukraine.

6 March
 A NATO aircraft mistakenly strikes an Afghan National Army outpost in Logar Province, Afghanistan, killing five and wounding seven Afghan soldiers.
 More than 40 women, members of the Code Pink antiwar activist group, stage a sit-in at Cairo International Airport in Cairo, Egypt, to protest their detention there. They had been detained since arriving there on 4 March, preventing them from traveling to the Gaza Strip. The detainees include Medea Benjamin, Mairead Maguire, and Ann Wright.
 At the request of Estonia, Latvia, and Lithuania, the U.S. Air Force transfers six F-15 Eagle fighters and a Boeing KC-135 Stratotanker tanker aircraft from RAF Lakenheath, England, to Šiauliai International Airport in Šiauliai, Lithuania – reinforcing four U.S. Air Force F-15s already based there for a routine NATO deployment – as a show of NATOs commitment to the defense of the three countries during the Crimean crisis.
 An administrative law judge in the United States overturns a fine the U.S. Federal Aviation Administration (FAA) imposed on the operator of a small unmanned aerial vehicle (UAV), finding that the FAA has no legal authority over small, unmanned aircraft. The FAA appeals the decision.

7 March
 Russian troops ram a truck through the gate of a Ukrainian Air Force base outside Sevastopol, Ukraine, seize part of the base, and threaten to shoot the bases Ukrainian personnel if they do not surrender the rest of the base. The Russians withdraw after the Ukrainians refuse to surrender.

8 March
An investigation concludes that the airliner turns off course after ground stations lose radio contact with it and flies to the southern Indian Ocean, where it presumably crashes, although an extensive search yields no trace of it.

10 March
 NATO officials announce that NATO aircraft will fly reconnaissance missions over Poland and Romania that will peer into Russia. NATO apparently intends the announcement of the otherwise routine flights to signal to Russia that NATO is monitoring Russian actions closely during the Crimean crisis.

11 March
 An Israeli military Skylark unmanned aerial vehicle suffers a technical malfunction and crashes in the southern Gaza Strip. Hamas members claim to have captured it and handed it over to security forces.
 An Israeli airstrike against the southern Gaza Strip kills three members of the Islamic Jihad Movement in Palestine. The Israeli military says that the strike was in response to mortar attacks from the area against Israeli territory.

12 March
 As the Islamic Jihad Movement in Palestine fires 60 rockets into Israeli territory from the Gaza Strip, Israel retaliates with 29 airstrikes, but neither side suffers casualties.

13 March
 Israel conducts airstrikes against a Popular Resistance Committees camp in the southern Gaza Strip and three other sites north of it after the group launches eight rockets against Israeli territory during the day.
 An AgustaWestland AW139 helicopter operated by Haughey Air crashes in the United Kingdom shortly after take-off from Gillingham, Norfolk, for a flight to Rostrevor, County Down, killing all four people aboard, including Edward Haughey, Baron Ballyedmond.

15 March
 After 60 Russian troops and three Russian armored personnel carriers seize a natural gas pumping station on Arabat Spit in Ukraines Kherson Oblast in the first Russian military action of the Crimean crisis against Ukrainian territory outside the Crimea, Ukrainian aircraft scramble in response and Ukrainian paratroopers take up positions to contain the Russians. Two hours after the initial Russian incursion, Russian helicopters land 60 more Russian troops at Strilkove; they seize the village to reinforce the Russian position at the pumping station.

18 March
 A Eurocopter AS350 B2 helicopter operated by Helicopters, Inc., under lease to KOMO-TV crashes into the street below immediately after takeoff from its rooftop helipad in downtown Seattle, Washington, exploding and setting three cars on fire. Both men in the helicopter die, and a man in one of the cars suffers life-threatening burns.
 Air Canada suspends flights to Caracas, Venezuela, claiming that it can no longer guarantee safe operations there in the face of civil unrest in Venezuela.

19 March
 In retaliation for the explosion of a bomb that Israel claims the Syrian Army planted or assisted Hizbollah in planting that wounded four Israeli soldiers the previous day, Israeli Air Force planes strike three Syrian Army targets – a military headquarters, a training facility, and an artillery battery – near Quneitra in the Golan Heights, killing one Syrian soldier and wounding seven.

22 March
 Russian ground forces storm and capture the Ukrainian Air Force base at Belbek Airport and the Ukrainian Navy air base at Novofedorivka. Their capture makes Russian control of the Crimean Peninsula virtually complete.

23 March
 A Turkish Air Force F-16 Fighting Falcon shoots down a Syrian Air Force jet fighter that Turkey claims violated its airspace. The Syrian pilot ejects safely, and his plane crashes inside Syria near the town of Keseb.

24 March
 An Airbus A330-300 flying as Malaysia Airlines Flight 066 from Kuala Lumpur, Malaysia, to Seoul, South Korea, makes an emergency landing in Hong Kong, China, due to the failure of its main power generator. An auxiliary power unit is deployed and 271 passengers are put on flights with other carriers.

27 March
World Airways ceases operations after 66 years of service.

28 March
 Venezuelan Airlines Association President Humberto Figueroa announces that President of Venezuela Nicolas Maduro has authorized the release of dollars Venezuela owes to 24 airlines, whose earnings in Venezuela have been trapped there, denominated in Venezuelan bolívars that are losing value quickly due to inflation and frequent currency devaluations, by Venezuelan currency exchange laws.

30 March
 TAM Airlines and US Airways leave the Star Alliance airline alliance.

31 March
 TAM Airlines and US Airways join the Oneworld airline alliance.

April
 1 April
 A 28-year-old Kosovar man being deported from Germany to Hungary aboard a Lufthansa airliner bound from Munich to Budapest becomes unruly and threatens the crew with a razor blade after takeoff, slightly injuring one flight attendant. The plane returns to Munich, where the other 76 passengers disembark and police negotiate with the man, arresting him without further incident.

3 April
 Tragedy strikes as 222 people attempt to set a skydiving record over Eloy, Arizona, for formation jumping when one of them, 46-year-old German skydiver Diana Paris, falls to her death after her parachute malfunctions.

7 April
 The U.S. National Transportation Safety Board (NTSB) sends a letter to the U.S. Federal Aviation Administration (FAA) recommending that the FAA establish licensing requirements and safety standards for commercial balloon tour operators and make them subject to FAA safety inspections, regulating them in a manner similar to the way it regulates commercial airplane and helicopter tour operators. The NTSB writes, "The potential for a high number of fatalities in a single air tour balloon accident is of particular concern if air tour balloon operators continue to conduct operations under less stringent regulations and oversight." The FAA will reject the recommendation in November 2015.

13 April 
 A 14-year-old Dutch girl identified as "Sarah" tweets to American Airlines pretending to be a member of Al-Qaeda and claiming that she plans to "do something really big" on 1 June 2014. Within six minutes, the airline responds, saying that it has forwarded her IP address to the Federal Bureau of Investigation. On 14 April, Rotterdam police arrest her; they release her on 15 April. The incident sparks a debate on Twitter between those criticizing the girl for the prank and those criticizing authorities for reacting harshly to pranks and prompts at least a dozen other teenagers to tweet prank terrorist threats to American Airlines and Southwest Airlines.
 A man acting strangely aboard a Southwest Airlines flight from Chicago, Illinois, to Sacramento, California – at one point emerging from a lavatory soaking wet – attempts to open the aircrafts door while in flight, seeking to jump out. Passengers and air marshals subdue him, and the plane makes an emergency landing in Omaha, Nebraska, where the man is taken into custody.

14 April
Google confirms that it has purchased Titan Aerospace, a manufacturer of unmanned aerial vehicles (UAVs). Google plans to use Titan Aerospace to develop UAVs capable of bringing Internet connectivity to remote parts of the world. The UAVs are to supplement Googles Project Loon, which employs huge helium balloons for the same purpose. Titan Aerospace can produce UAVs which can remain airborne for up to five years without refueling or landing.

15 April
 Heavy gunfire erupts when a Ukrainian jet attempts to land at Kramatorsk, Ukraine, at an airfield under blockade by pro-Russian forces. Ukrainian troops arrive by helicopter and repeatedly open fire on pro-Russian protesters to keep them away from the airfields perimeter fence.

16 April
 In the Syrian Civil War, Syrian Air Force jets bomb opposition-held areas in the Old City of Homs, Syria.
 Royal Jordanian Air Force warplanes destroy several ground vehicles, possibly belonging to Syrian rebel forces, trying to cross the border from Syria into Jordan.

19 April
 A missile strike by an American unmanned aerial vehicle against a ground vehicle at Al Bayda', Yemen, kills at least nine suspected members of al-Qaeda in the Arabian Peninsula in the vehicle and three civilians in a passing car.
 A Mexican Hawker 700A crashes into a building on final approach to Plan de Guadalupe International Airport at Ramos Arizpe, Mexico, killing all eight people on board, including Mexican newscaster Antonio Davila.

20 April
 An airstrike in the Mahfad Mountains in Yemen against suspected al-Qaeda in the Arabian Peninsula training facilities kills several suspected members of the group.
 A small plane crashes at the Jämijärvi airfield in Finland, killing eight parachutists on board. Three people survive after parachuting from the aircraft.
 At San Jose International Airport, a 16-year-old boy stows away in the wheel well of a Boeing 767 operating as Hawaiian Airlines Flight 45 from San Jose, California, to Kahului, Maui, Hawaii.

21 April
 A Malaysia Airlines Boeing 737-800 operating as Flight 192 from Kuala Lumpur, Malaysia, to Bangalore, India, experiences a right-hand landing gear malfunction upon takeoff and makes a successful emergency landing.
 Yemeni forces supported by American unmanned aerial vehicles continue attacks against a major al-Qaeda in the Arabian Peninsula training camp in Yemen. The Government of Yemen claims that 55 of the terrorist groups members have been killed in the two days of attacks.

23 April
 A Russian Federation Air Force Sukhoi Su-27 (NATO reporting name "Flanker") intercepts a United States Air Force Boeing RC-135U Combat Sent aircraft conducting a surveillance flight in international airspace over the Sea of Okhotsk, crossing the nose of the RC-135U within . A United States Department of Defense official calls it a "reckless intercept."

24 April
 Pakistan Air Force aircraft attack two Islamic militant hideouts in the Tirah Valley in Pakistans Khyber Agency, killing 37 suspected militants and wounding 18.
 Petro Poroshenko, the leading candidate for the presidency of Ukraine, claims that three Russian helicopters have violated Ukrainian airspace and that the Government of Ukraine is investigating the incident.
 Russia begins military drills along its border with Ukraine, and Sergey Shoygu, Russias Minister of Defense, announces that the drills will include aerial exercises.

25 April
 Pro-Russia separatists destroy a Ukrainian government helicopter at a restricted airfield near Kramatorsk, Ukraine, using a rocket-propelled grenade.
 Late in the day, the United States Department of Defense announces that Russian aircraft have violated Ukrainian airspace several times over the previous 24 hours, apparently to test the capabilities of the Ukrainian radar system.

26 April
 A British helicopter crashes in Kandahar Province, Afghanistan, killing five North Atlantic Treaty Organization (NATO) soldiers on board. It is the greatest loss of life among NATO personnel in Afghanistan in a single incident since six American military personnel died in a helicopter crash on 17 December 2013.
 Prime Minister of Ukraine Arseniy Yatsenyuk tells reporters that Russian military aircraft violated Ukrainian airspace seven times overnight on 25–26 April in an attempt "to provoke Ukraine to start a war."

29 April
 Tunisian Air Force jets and military helicopters support Tunisian Army troops and marines as they begin an operation to destroy an Islamic militant stronghold in Tunisias Chaambi Mountains harboring members of Ansar al-Sharia and Al Qaeda in the Islamic Maghreb.
 The Organisation for the Prohibition of Chemical Weapons announces in The Hague in the Netherlands that it will send a fact-finding mission to Syria to investigate allegations that Syrian Air Force aircraft had dropped chlorine gas on Syrian civilians in at least two villages in northern Syria in recent weeks.
 The International Air Transport Association (IATA) announces that Venezuela has done little to pay its dollar debt to 24 airlines despite its pledge to do so on 28 March. The IATA reports that the equivalent of $3,900,000,000 owed to the airlines is trapped in Venezuela by Venezuelan currency exchange laws, and that at least 11 airlines have cut service, sales, or routes to Venezuela over the previous year because of their inability to repatriate earnings. Some airlines have cut capacity to Venezuela by as much as 78 percent.

30 April
 North Atlantic Treaty Organization (NATO) jets support Afghan security forces in an attack on the Haqqani Network in Afghanistan near the border with Pakistan. The attack kills 60 Islamic militants.
 Syrian Air Force jets hit the Ain Jalout elementary school in the rebel-held eastern part of Aleppo, Syria, with at least six bombs as teachers and students are setting up an exhibit of childrens drawings of the Syrian Civil War, killing 20 people, 17 of them children.
 A failure of the En Route Automation Modernization (ERAM) computer system at a Federal Aviation Administration air traffic control facility at Palmdale Regional Airport in Palmdale, California, grounds flights at airports in the Los Angeles, California, area for over an hour. At Los Angeles International Airport over 200 flights are delayed and 23 cancelled, and departures from Bob Hope Airport in Burbank are delayed for 90 minutes. Planes also are grounded at John Wayne Airport in Santa Ana, California, and McCarran International Airport in Las Vegas, Nevada. Dozens of inbound flights are diverted to other airports, and flights to the Los Angeles area are held on the ground throughout the United States until the problem is corrected. Twenty-seven flights to Los Angeles International are canceled, 212 are delayed, and 27 are diverted to other airports, including 15 that land at Phoenix Sky Harbor Airport in Phoenix, Arizona, and five that land at Salt Lake City International Airport in Salt Lake City, Utah. The flight disruptions affect tens of thousands of passengers.

May
 The United States deploys one unmanned aerial vehicle (UAV) to Chad to fly reconnaissance missions to assist in the search for schoolgirls missing in Nigeria as a result of Boko Haram's kidnapping of schoolgirls in Chibok. The UAV will operate for several months before being withdrawn.

1 May
 A Syrian government helicopter drops three barrel bombs on a marketplace in the rebel-held Hillok district of Aleppo, killing at least 33 people. One report places the death toll at 44.
 SriLankan Airlines joins the Oneworld airline alliance. It becomes the first airline from the Indian subcontinent to join any airline alliance.

2 May
 Pro-Russian separatists shoot down two Ukrainian military Mil Mi-24 (NATO reporting name "Hind") helicopters, one reportedly with a surface-to-air missile, as Ukrainian troops attack separatists in Sloviansk, Ukraine. Two crewmen aboard the helicopters die and the separatists capture and hospitalize the pilot of one of the downed helicopters. A Ukrainian Mil Mi-8 (NATO reporting name "Hip") helicopter reportedly carrying medics is damaged during the fighting, with one person on board wounded.

3–4 May (overnight)
 Airstrikes and Yemeni military ground operations combine to kill 37 suspected al Qaeda in the Arabian Peninsula members in Meyfaa, Yemen.

4 May
 Airstrikes support Yemeni military ground operations against an al Qaeda in the Arabian Peninsula stronghold in the Naqba Hills in Shabwah Governorate in southern Yemen. Six suspected Islamic militants and four Yemeni soldiers are killed.

5 May
 Heavy machine gun fire from pro-Russian separatists shoots down a Ukrainian military Mil Mi-24 (NATO reporting name "Hind") helicopter near Sloviansk, Ukraine. The helicopter crashes in a river, and Ukrainian security personnel rescue its crew.

12 May
United States Government officials announce that American aircraft are flying surveillance missions over Nigeria to assist the Nigerian government in its search for victims of the Chibok schoolgirl kidnapping in April by Boko Haram.

13 May
In Yemen, a Yemeni Air Force jet attacks three trucks carrying explosives from the Shabwa Governorate to the Marib Governorate as Al Qaeda in the Arabian Peninsula forces retreat in the face of a Yemeni government offensive. All three truck drivers die, as do five other people believed to be Islamic militants.
Smoke from an overheated lavatory exhaust fan forces air traffic controllers to evacuate the control room of the Terminal Radar Approach Control (TRACON) facility in Elgin, Illinois, disrupting air traffic into and out of Chicago, Illinois. Before they return three hours later, more than 600 flights at O'Hare International Airport and 75 flights at Midway International Airport are cancelled, and although a back-up facility in Aurora, Illinois, takes over the control of inbound aircraft, some inbound flights headed for the two airports are diverted elsewhere.

15 May
A tornado touches down  from Miami International Airport in Miami, Florida, and another funnel cloud is spotted nearby 20 minutes later, prompting the cancellation of at least four flights and delays for dozens of others.

17 May
At the end of a flight from Vientiane, Laos, the Lao People's Liberation Army Air Force Antonov An-74TK-300 (NATO reporting name "Coaler") RDPL-34020 crashes in a wooded area between  short of the runway while on final approach to Xieng Khouang Airport in Phonsavan, Laos. Between 14 and 20 people reportedly are aboard and only three survive. Among the dead are Douangchay Phichit, the Laotian Deputy Prime Minister and Minister of National Defense, and his wife, as well as Thongbanh Sengaphone, the Laotian Minister of Public Security; Cheuang Sombounkhanh of the Secretariat of the Central Committee of the Lao People's Revolutionary Party and chairman of the Propaganda Training Committee; Pany Yathotou, a member of the Laotian National Assembly and its president from 2010 to 2014; and Soukanh Mahalath, the governor of Vientiane Province. It is the second-deadliest aviation accident in Laotian history, exceeded only by the crash of Lao Airlines Flight 301 in October 2013.

21 May
 Pakistan Air Force jets and Pakistani military helicopters attack Islamic militant hideouts, killing 60 Islamic militants. Most of the strikes take place around Mir Ali in North Waziristan, Pakistan.

24 May
 During a joint maritime exercise involving the armed forces of Japan and Russia, Chinese People's Liberation Army Air Force fighter aircraft scramble to intercept Japanese military planes operating within China's expanded air defense identification zone over the East China Sea, which Japan does not recognize. The following day, the Japanese government accuses the Chinese aircraft of having come dangerously close to Japanese aircraft, claiming that Chinese Sukhoi Su-27 (NATO reporting name "Flanker") fighters came within  of a Japanese Lockheed OP-3C Orion surveillance plane near the disputed Senkaku (or Diaoyu) Islands and within  of a Japanese NAMC YS-11EB electronic intelligence aircraft. China responds that Japans violation of a Chinese "no-fly" order for foreign military aircraft in Chinas air defense identification zone during the Japanese-Russian exercise justifies the actions of the Chinese aircraft.

26 May
 After two days of fighting, Ukrainian troops supported by Ukrainian Air Force MiG fighters and Mil Mi-8 (NATO reporting name "Hip") and Mil Mi-24 (NATO reporting name "Hind") military helicopters retake Donetsk Sergey Prokofiev International Airport in Donetsk, Ukraine, from pro-Russian separatists.
 Venezuela reaches deals with six airlines – Aeroméxico, Aruba Airlines, Avianca, Insel Air, TACA, and TAME – to pay dollar debt held up by Venezuelan currency controls and prevent them from ending service to Venezuela.

28 May
 The search for Malaysia Airlines Flight 370, which disappeared on 8 March, is suspended, having found no trace of the aircraft. It will not resume until October, after an extensive underwater mapping effort in the next planned search area is completed.

29 May
 Russian separatists shoot down a Ukrainian Mil Mi-8 (NATO reporting name "Hip") military transport helicopter near Sloviansk, Ukraine, with a shoulder-fired surface-to-air missile, killing between 12 and 14 of the Ukrainian military personnel aboard, including General Serhiy Kulchitskiy, who was in charge of combat training for the National Guard of Ukraine. Ukrainian Air Force jets join Ukrainian artillery in a counterattack, bombing the forest from which the missile was launched.

31 May
 19-year-old pilot Matt Guthmiller departs Gillespie Field in El Cajon, California in an attempt to become the youngest pilot to circumnavigate the globe, solo.
 A private Gulfstream IV business jet catches fire while taking off from Hanscom Field in Bedford, Massachusetts, and crashes, killing all seven people on board. Lewis Katz, co-owner of The Philadelphia Inquirer, the Philadelphia Daily News, and Philly.com, is among the dead.

June

1 June
 A Libyan Air Force jet bombs positions held by Ansar al-Sharia in Benghazi, Libya. In a separate raid, Libyan aircraft strike a palace in the western section of Benghazi reportedly held by Islamic militants, apparently in support of renegade General Khalifa Hifter.

2 June
 The Solar Impulse 2 solar-powered aircraft makes its maiden flight over Payerne, Switzerland. Plans call for Solar Impulse 2 to become the first solar-powered aircraft to circumnavigate the earth in 2015.
 Libyan Army helicopters strike Islamic militant targets in eastern Benghazi, Libya.

6 June
 Pro-Russian separatists shoot down a Ukrainian Antonov An-30 (NATO reporting name "Clank") military reconnaissance plane near Slovyansk, Ukraine, killing five crew members.

8 June
 The first Federal Aviation Administration-approved commercial unmanned aerial vehicle (UAV) flight over land in the United States takes place, as an AeroVironment Puma UAV makes a flight at Prudhoe Bay, Alaska, to survey pipelines, roads, and equipment for BP.

8–9 June (overnight)
 Ten members of the Pakistani Taliban attack Jinnah International Airport in Karachi, Pakistan, killing 26 people. Pakistan Army commandos respond, killing seven of the attackers. The three other attackers commit suicide.

9 June
 As a team of American and Afghan troops patrolling Afghanistan's Arghandab District attempt to board a helicopter, they come under attack by Islamic militants. A United States Air Force B-1B Lancer bomber conducts an airstrike against the attackers but mistakenly hits the American-Afghan team, killing five American troops.
 Islamic State forces capture Mosul International Airport during their successful battle to take Mosul, Iraq, from Iraqi government forces.
 A violent storm with wind gusts of up to  strikes Düsseldorf Airport in Düsseldorf, Germany, forcing the airport to close for an hour. Ten departing flights are cancelled and ten arriving flights are diverted to other airports.

10 June
 Pakistan announces that it has resumed air attacks s against Islamic militants and that airstrikes in the Tirah Valley have killed 25 militants.
 According to Pakistani officials, "three or four" Islamic militants attack a Karachi Airport Security Force base at Jinnah International Airport in Karachi, Pakistan, shutting down the airport for the second time in two days. Security forces repel them.
 The U.S. Federal Aviation Administration announces publicly that it had approved the first commercial UAV flight over land in the United States and that the flight had taken place on 8 June.

11 June
 Missiles fired by an American unmanned aerial vehicle strike a house and a nearby ground vehicle in the Darga Mandi area of North Waziristan, Pakistan, killing six suspected Islamic militants. It is the first American drone strike in Pakistan in six months.
 After Palestinian militants fire a rocket into southern Israel from the northern Gaza Strip, an Israeli Air Force aircraft strikes a target in the northern Gaza Strip, killing one person and wounding three others.

12 June
 The low-cost Indian-Malaysian airline AirAsia India begins flight operations, offering service between Bangalore and Goa with Airbus A320-200 aircraft and making the Malaysian airline AirAsia the first foreign airline to operate a subsidiary in India.
 Eight missiles fired by American unmanned aerial vehicles strike a compound in Dande Darpa Khel near Miramshah, North Waziristan, Pakistan, killing between four and ten members of the Haqqani Network and wounding four others.

13 June
 American physician Richard Rockefeller is killed when the Piper PA-46-500TP Malibu Meridian he is piloting strikes a tree while taking off in dense fog and heavy rain from Westchester County Airport in White Plains, New York, and crashes in Harrison, a mile (1.6 km) from the airport.

14 June
 A missile strike by an American unmanned aerial vehicle against a ground vehicle in Yemens Shabwah Governorate kills five al-Qaeda in the Arabian Peninsula members, including the commander known as Musaad al Habashi.
 Pro-Russian separatists open fire with antiaircraft weapons and heavy machine guns and shoot down a Ukrainian Ilyushin Il-76 (NATO reporting name "Candid") military transport aircraft carrying 40 Ukrainian paratroopers and a crew of nine as it lands at Luhansk International Airport in Luhansk, Ukraine. All 49 people on board die.

15 June
 Pakistan Air Force jets strike six Islamic militant hideouts in North Waziristan, Pakistan, killing 140 militants, including Abu Abdul Rehman al-Maani, who is believed to have helped orchestrate 8 June attack on Jinnah International Airport in Karachi, Pakistan.

16 June
 Pakistan Air Force jets continue strikes against Islamic militant hideouts in North Waziristan, killing 27.
 Syrian military helicopters drop barrel bombs on the rebel-held Sukkari neighborhood in southern Aleppo, Syria, reportedly killing between 27 and 30 people.

17 June
 Thai AirAsia X, Thailand's first long-haul, low-cost airline, begins flight operations, offering service between Bangkok's Don Mueang International Airport and Incheon International Airport in South Korea.

18 June
 The Government of Iraq announces that it has requested that the United States conduct airstrikes against Islamic State of Iraq and Syria (ISIS) forces which have taken control of much of the northern half of Iraq.

20 June
 The U.S. National Park Service directs park managers at all 401 national parks and national monuments in the United States to ban all flights by remotely controlled airplanes and helicopters. The ban does not apply to unmanned aerial vehicles park managers use for scientific research and search-and-rescue purposes or to some formally approved flights by hobbyists.

21 June
 Syrian aircraft conduct six strikes against al-Muhasan, Syria, which Islamic State of Iraq and Syria forces had seized the previous day. The airstrikes reportedly kill 13 ISIS members and three civilians.

22 June
 Amid mounting public opposition to its plan to fly illegal immigrants from south Texas to San Diego and El Centro, California, to relieve pressure on its facilities in Texas, the United States Border Patrol cancels the plan. The plan had called for one flight each every three days to San Diego and El Centro beginning on 23 June, with each aircraft carrying 140 illegal immigrants.

23 June
 Israeli Air Force aircraft strike nine military targets inside Syria in retaliation for a cross-border attack killed an Israeli teenager the previous day. Syria claims that the strikes have killed four people and wounded nine.
 Kenyan aircraft strike Anole and Kuday in Lower Juba, Somalia, killing 80 al-Shabaab members. Thirty die in Anole and 50 in Kuday.
 During an exercise in which two Eurofighter Typhoons operated by the German Air Forces Taktisches Luftwaffengeschwader 31 "Boelcke" practice intercepting a civilian airliner that is out of radio contact simulated by a Learjet 35A registered as D-CGFI, one of the Typhoons collides in mid-air with the Learjet. The severely damaged Typhoon returns to base, but the Learjet – operated by the GFD Gesellschaft Fur Flugzieldarstellung, a subsidiary company of Airbus Defence and Space – crashes near houses in Olsberg, Germany, killing its crew of two. It is the first mid-air collision in German airspace for 12 years.

24 June
 A shoulder-fired surface-to-air missile fired by pro-Russian separatists from the village of Bylbasovka, just outside Slovyansk, Ukraine, shoots down a Ukrainian Mil Mi-8 (NATO reporting name "Hip") helicopter, killing all nine people aboard the helicopter. The incident threatens to cause a ceasefire between the two sides to break down.

27 June
 An Israeli airstrike destroys a vehicle in the Shati refugee camp in the Gaza Strip, killing Popular Resistance Committees members Osama Hassumi and Mohammad Fatzih.
He makes the jump at the age of 101 years three days. His record will stand until 15 May 2017.

28 June
 Israeli Air Force aircraft strike nine targets – a weapons-manufacturing site and rocket launchers belonging to Hamas and the Islamic Jihad Movement in Palestine – in the Gaza Strip in retaliation for rocket attacks against Israeli from the Gaza Strip. The strikes reportedly kill one Islamic militant.
 The National Aeronautics and Space Administration (NASA) conducts the first test of the Low-Density Supersonic Decelerator (LDSD), a space vehicle designed to create atmospheric drag in order to decelerate during entry through a planet's atmosphere.

29 June
 During the morning, Israeli Air Force aircraft strike 12 targets in the Gaza Strip in retaliation for rockets launched into Israel over the weekend. In the evening, Israeli Air Force aircraft strike Khan Younis in the Gaza Strip to halt preparations for another rocket attack.

30 June
 The Pakistan Army reports that two weeks of Pakistan Air Force strikes against Islamic militants in northwestern Pakistan have killed 359 militants.

July

1 July
 The second incarnation of AirAsia Japan is founded, with plans to begin flight operations in June 2015.
 Israeli Air Force aircraft strike 34 Hamas and Islamic Jihad Movement in Palestine structures in the Gaza Strip in retaliation for rockets fired into Israel on 30 June.

2 July
 The Skyward International Aviation Fokker 50 cargo aircraft 5Y-CET crashes on takeoff from Jomo Kenyatta International Airport in Nairobi, Kenya. The plane comes down in a residential area in Utawala, Embakasi,  from the end of the runway, killing all four people on board.
 Anti-aircraft fire from Russian separatists strikes a Ukrainian Air Force Sukhoi Su-24 (NATO reporting name "Fencer") attack aircraft over Donetsk, Ukraine. The aircraft returns to base.

3 July
 Islamic militants fire two rockets into the military section of Kabul International Airport in Kabul, Afghanistan. One of them sets fire to the helicopter of President of Afghanistan Hamid Karzai as its sits on the tarmac, destroying it.
 The Israel Defense Forces announces that Israeli Air Force aircraft conducted 16 strikes on Hamas targets in the Gaza Strip on 2 and 3 July.
 The United States Department of Defense grounds its entire fleet of 97 F-35 Lightning II aircraft for the eighth time pending engine inspections in the wake of a 23 June engine fire in a United States Air Force F-35A Lightning II as it prepared for take off at Eglin Air Force Base, Florida.
Seven of the derailed cars are carrying cargo to Boeing factories in Renton, Washington, including six new Boeing 737 fuselages and large assemblies for new Boeing 747 and Boeing 777 aircraft. All six 737 fuselages fall off the cars, and three of them slide down an embankment into the Clark Ford River. The fuselages are expected to be recovered and scrapped. The accident raises questions as to whether Boeing will be able to meet its delivery deadlines for some of its customers.

4 July
 In an attempt to rescue four American hostages – James Foley, Peter Kassig, Kayla Mueller, and Steven Sotloff – held in Syria by the Islamic State, MH-60 Black Hawk helicopters of the United States Army's 160th Special Operations Aviation Regiment supported by a variety of fixed-wing aircraft and helicopters insert over 100 special operations personnel to raid an Islamic State prison facility. Under fire from Islamic State forces, the raiders find that the hostages have been moved elsewhere and quickly withdraw, suffering one casualty when a U.S. service member is slightly injured when Islamic State gunfire strikes a helicopter. By February 2015, the Islamic State will have murdered all four of the hostages.

5 July
 A Piper Navajo plane crashes shortly after takeoff from Rudniki Airport in Poland, killing 11 parachute jumpers and the pilot. One person survives.
 Irans IRNA state news organization reports that an Iranian pilot has been killed in Iraq and says that he died defending Islamic holy places in Samarra, but provides no details as to the date or circumstances of his death. Irans semi-official Fars News Agency publishes photographs of what it reports to be his funeral. It is Irans first public acknowledgement that its armed forces are involved in combat in Iraq.

6 July
 Unidentified aircraft conduct at least three strikes against Mosul, Iraq, which is under the control of Islamic State forces. The United States and the Government of Iraq both deny involvement, and Iran is suspected of having carried out the raids.

6–7 July (overnight)
 Israeli Air Force aircraft strike 14 Hamas targets in the Gaza Strip including concealed rocket launchers, killing nine people.

7 July
 A Vietnamese People's Air Force Mil Mi-171 (NATO reporting name "Hip") helicopter with 21 troops and crew members on board for parachute training crashes in Vietnams Thạch Thất District on the outskirts of Hanoi due to a technical malfunction, killing 19 of those aboard and leaving the two survivors severely injured. The incident prompts Vietnam to ground its entire Mi-171 fleet.

7–8 July (overnight)
 The Israeli Defense Force launches Operation Protective Edge with a goal of ending Hamas rocket attacks on Israel from the Gaza Strip. The Israeli Air Force strike 47 targets in the Gaza Strip overnight belonging to Hamas and other militant organizations, including underground rocket launching sites, command and control centers, the homes of Hamas members, and other "infrastructure."

8 July
 The Israeli Air Force strikes over 150 targets in the Gaza Strip, killing 24 Palestinians and wounding 152. Hamas operative Mohammed Shabaan is among the dead, killed when at least two missiles strike his car in Gaza City.
 The U.S. National Park Service unveils a plaque designating as a national monument the crash site of two airliners that collided in midair in 1956 and crashed into the Grand Canyon, killing all 128 on board the two planes.

9 July
 Israeli manned aircraft and unmanned aerial vehicles have struck 60 houses in the Gaza Strip since the beginning of Operation Protective Edge on 7 July in an attempt to destroy Hamas weapons and facilities hidden among the civilian population. Since the operation began, Israeli strikes have killed 41 people and injured at least 300 people severely enough for them to require hospitalization.

10 July
 Two missiles fired by an American unmanned aerial vehicle strike a car near Doga Mada Khel in the Datta Khel district of North Waziristan, Pakistan, killing at six Islamic militants.

11 July
 Air India joins the Star Alliance.
 Flying a Pilatus PC-12 NG, Amelia Rose Earhart and her co-pilot Shane Jordan complete a 17-stop, 24,300-nautical-mile (27,964-mile; 45,004-km) circumnavigation of the earth, landing at Oakland, California – from which they had begun the journey on 26 June – spending 108 hours in the air. Earhart makes the flight to recreate and complete the final flight of her namesake Amelia Earhart, who had disappeared in 1937 while attempting a similar circumnavigation. Thirty-one years old, she becomes the second-youngest woman after Richarda Morrow-Tait to pilot a plane around the world.

12 July
 In the single deadliest airstrike of Operation Protective Edge thus far, missiles fired by Israeli Air Force aircraft strike the house where Gaza police chief Tayseer al-Batsh is praying, critically wounding him and killing 18 members of his extended family.

13 July
 The Gazan Health Ministry reports that 169 residents of the Gaza Strip have been killed in Israeli strikes thus far in Operation Protective Edge. Hamas rocket fire has seriously injured several Israelis, but no Israelis have died in the rocket attacks.
 Rival militias battle for control of Tripoli International Airport in Tripoli, Libya. At least six people die and 25 are wounded in the fighting. Libyan civil aviation authorities announce that the airport will be closed for three days because of security concerns.

14 July
 Nineteen-year-old Matt Guthmiller lands at Gillespie Field in El Cajon, California, becoming the youngest person ever to complete a solo flight around the world. The final leg of his trip is a 16-hour flight across the eastern Pacific Ocean from Kailua-Kona, Hawaii, to El Cajon.
 The Israel Defense Forces shoot down an unmanned aerial vehicle (UAV) over Ashdod, Israel. It appears to be Hamass first use of a UAV against Israel from the Gaza Strip.
Its eight crew members parachute to safety, although four of them are captured by pro-Russian separatists. The separatists claim to have shot the plane down, but Ukrainian defense officials say that the shoulder-fired surface-to-air missiles available to the separatists lack the capability to hit a plane flying at such a high altitude and accuse Russia of shooting down the plane, either with a Pantsir-S1 (NATO reporting name "SA-22 Greyhound") surface-to-air missile launched from Russian territory or with an air-to-air missile fired from Russian airspace by a Russian fighter based at Millerovo, Russia.

15 July
 Israel halts airstrikes against the Gaza Strip while the Government of Israel and Hamas consider an Egyptian ceasefire proposal. Israeli strikes resume after six hours when Hamas rejects the proposal. The Palestinian death toll rises to at least 204, and the first Israeli is killed by a Hamas rocket.
 Unidentified aircraft strike an apartment complex in Snizhne, Ukraine, with several missiles, destroying it and a nearby house and killing 11 people. Ukraine denies that the Ukrainian Air Force conducted the strike, and one Ukrainian military analyst blames it on the Russian Federation Air Force.
 The United States Department of Defense cancels the international debut of the F-35 Lightning II fighter at the Farnborough Air Show, planned for later in the week by an F-35B, because of the grounding of the F-35 fleet earlier in the month.

16 July
 A Pakistan Air Force strike against a house in North Waziristan as a ground vehicle passes by kills 15 to 20 people. Another Pakistan Air Force strike against Islamic militants attempting to flee North Waziristan kills 35 people.
 Israeli aircraft hit the headquarters of the Gazan Interior Ministry and begin airstrikes against the homes of top Hamas leaders in the Gaza Strip. One strike targeting what Israel describes as a Hamas operative accidentally kills four Palestinian children playing on a beach. By the evening, the Palestinian death toll due to Israeli strikes reaches 222, with another 1,600 injure
 Pro-Russian separatists shoot down a Ukrainian Air Force Sukhoi Su-25 (NATO reporting name "Frogfoot") ground-attack aircraft near Amvrosiivka, Ukraine.

17 July
 Four Afghan insurgents stage a predawn attack on Kabul International Airport in Kabul, Afghanistan. All incoming flights are diverted elsewhere as security forces fight the insurgents and eventually surround them in an unfinished building close to the airport and kill them.
 During a flight from Amsterdam, the Netherlands, to Kuala Lumpur, Malaysia, with 283 passengers and a crew of 15 aboard, a Boeing 777-200ER operating as Malaysia Airlines Flight 17 (codeshared as KLM Flight 4103), is shot down by an unidentified surface-to-air missile and crashes near Hrabove in Donetsk Oblast, Ukraine, killing all on board. The Ukrainian government claims that either Russia or Russian separatists in Ukraine shot down the airliner while it cruised at an altitude of  using the Buk missile system (NATO reporting name "Gadfly;" U.S. Department of Defense designation "SA-11"). The United States later confirms that the missile was launched from the separatist-controlled portion of Ukraine. With 298 people killed, it is the deadliest Malaysia Airlines incident to date, surpassing Malaysia Airlines Flight 370, a Boeing 777-200ER which disappeared with 239 people aboard on 8 March 2014.
 The Israeli Air Force strikes the opening inside Israel of a tunnel used by Hamas members to infiltrate from the Gaza Strip, claiming to have killed one Hamas member. After a subsequent five-hour truce, an Israeli ground invasion of the Gaza Strip begins, supported by Israeli airstrikes.

18 July
 A Pakistan Air Force raid in North Waziristan bombs houses, reportedly killing 17 civilians.

19 July
 An American unmanned aerial vehicle strike in the Datta Khel area of North Waziristan, Pakistan, kills two commanders from the Punjabi Taliban and six other Islamic militants.

20 July
 Pakistani defense officials report that Pakistan Air Force strikes during the day have killed 28 Islamic militants in the Shawal valley in North Waziristan.

21 July
 Forty-seven people have been killed in a week of fighting between rival militias for control of Tripoli International Airport in Tripoli, Libya. An Afriqiyah Airways Airbus A330 has been destroyed during the fighting.

21–22 July (overnight)
 Israeli aircraft strike more than 70 targets in the Gaza Strip, including a sports complex, the former home of the late leader of Hamass military wing, and five mosques, setting off huge explosions in Gaza City during the predawn hours of 22 July.

22 July
 After a Hamas rocket fired from the Gaza Strip strikes a house near Ben Gurion Airport in Tel Aviv, Israel, the U.S. Federal Aviation Administration bans flights to Tel Aviv by U.S. airlines. Some major European airlines also suspend service to Tel Aviv.
 airBaltic becomes the world's first airline to accept bitcoin as payment for online bookings.

23 July
 Seventeen-year-old Pakistani-American pilot Haris Suleman and his father, Babar Suleman, die when their Hawker Beechcraft Bonanza crashes into the Pacific Ocean soon after takeoff from Pago Pago International Airport in Pago Pago, American Samoa, for a flight to Hawaii via Kiribati, after which they had planned to stop in California before returning to their home in Indiana. It was the final leg of their attempt to fly around the world – a 26,500-mile (42,673-km) journey with 25 stops in 15 countries – to raise money for a charity that builds schools for needy children in Pakistan. Departing Indiana on 19 June, the pair had hoped to break the world record for the youngest pilot-in-command in history to circumnavigate the earth in a single-engine plane in 30 days.
 TransAsia Airways Flight 222, an ATR 72-500 with 58 people on board, crashes near the village of Xixi in the township of Husi during a go-around after an unsuccessful landing attempt at Magong Airport on Taiwans Penghu Island at the end of a flight from Kaohsiung International Airport, Kaohsiung, Taiwan. The crash occurs in strong winds and heavy rain related to the passage of Typhoon Matmo near Penghu earlier in the day. Forty-eight of those aboard die, and all ten survivors are injured.
 The U.S. Federal Aviation Administration ends a two-day ban on flights to Tel Aviv, Israel, by U.S. airlines.

24 July
 Air Algérie Flight 5017, a McDonnell Douglas MD-83 with 110 passengers and a crew of six aboard, disappears from radar over northern Mali 50 minutes into its flight from Ouagadougou Airport, Ouagadougou, Burkina Faso, to Houari Boumediene Airport, Algiers, Algeria, and crashes, killing everyone on board. A French MQ-9 Reaper unmanned aerial vehicle discovers the aircrafts wreckage.
 The first two of 72 F-35 Lighting II fighters ordered for the Royal Australian Air Force roll off the Lockheed Martin production line at Fort Worth, Texas. The United States Department of Defense and Lockheed Martin consider the completion of aircraft for a foreign order to be a major milestone for the F-35 program.

25 July
 The Royal Jordanian Air Force shoots down what it describes as an "aerial target" – claimed by eyewitnesses to be an unmanned aerial vehicle – over Jordans Mafraq Governorate near the border with Syria.
 Ukrainian Defense and Security Council spokesman Andriy Lysenko claims that in the past two days alone Ukraine had shot down three Russian unmanned aerial vehicles flying over Ukraine, including one that was reconnoitering a Ukrainian military base at Amvrosiivka which had been under attack by rockets.

26 July
 American military surveillance aircraft, an airborne response force equipped with MV-22 Ospreys, and United States Air Force F-16 Fighting Falcons cover an overland evacuation of United States Embassy personnel from Tripoli, Libya, to Tunisia.

27 July
 Thirty-eight people die during fighting between rival militias over control of Tripoli International Airport in Tripoli, Libya.
 The body of a boy who stowed away in the wheel well of a U.S. Air Force C-130J Hercules cargo aircraft is discovered after the plane arrives at Ramstein Air Force Base in Germany after a routine mission in Africa involving stops in Senegal, Mali, Chad, and Tunisia and at Naval Air Station Sigonella, Italy. The stowaway – who probably climbed aboard in Mali and died due to the extreme conditions during high-altitude flight – represents a significant security breach for U.S. military aircraft.

29 July
 Chinese authorities announce that capacity at airports serving Shanghai will be cut by 75 percent for several days. The announcement caps two weeks of major, unexplained flight delays at airports in Beijing and Shanghai, with travelers stranded in airport terminals for days on end, infuriating some frustrated passengers to the point of violence.

30 July
 About 200 South Korean activists and North Korean defectors launch 50 unmanned helium balloons into North Korea from Paju, South Korea. The balloons carry hundreds of pounds of snacks, including 10,000 Choco pies, a popular snack cake North Korea banned in May 2013. The activists and defectors, who often send messages into North Korea by balloon, vow to send additional Choco pies on future balloon flights.
 After a drunk woman aboard Thomson Airways Flight 297 from Enfidha, Tunisia, to Edinburgh, Scotland, engages in a vulgarity-filled tirade, slaps a young girl, throws food and her prosthetic leg at the cabin crew, and demands cigarettes and a parachute, the airliners captain diverts to Gatwick Airport in West Sussex, England, where the woman is arrested.

August

2 August
 A day of fighting between rival militias over control of Tripoli International Airport in Tripoli, Libya, kills 22 people.
 The airline Emirates suspends service to Conakry, Guinea, because of a major Ebola virus disease outbreak in West Africa. Emirates flights which formerly stopped at Conakry on their way to Dakar, Senegal, will fly directly to Dakar instead during the suspension. Emirates becomes the first airline to suspend service because of the outbreak.
 The Phoenix Air Gulfstream III air ambulance jet N173PA carries the first Ebola patient ever to be evacuated to the United States, carrying humanitarian aid worker Dr. Kent Bradley, an employee of Samaritan's Purse, from Liberia via Lajes Air Base, Azores, and Bangor, Maine, to Dobbins Air Reserve Base in Marietta, Georgia. The flight also marks the first time that an aircraft equipped with a biological containment system – the Aeromedical Biological Containment System (ABCS) – carries a patient. Only two jets exist with a capability to transport an Ebola patient and both are Phoenix Air Gulfstream IIIs equipped with the ABCS.

3 August
 An Israeli airstrike against three Palestinian militants as they ride a motorcycle past the entrance of a United Nations shelter in Rafah in the southern Gaza Strip kills them as well as seven bystanders.

4 August
 Sven Hagemeier of Germany spends his 26th birthday flying on commercial airliners from Auckland, New Zealand, to Brisbane, Australia, and then on to Honolulu, Hawaii. Although he only spends 13 hours 10 minutes in the air, the 20-hour time zone change along the way stretches the day out to a length of 46 hours, allowing him to set the record – recognized by Guinness World Records in 2015 – for the longest birthday in history. He passes the previous record of 35 hours 25 minutes set by a Pakistani woman in June 1998.

5 August
 A three-day truce goes into effect between Hamas and Israel in the Gaza Strip, bringing a halt to Israeli airstrikes. Israel has struck 4,800 targets in the Gaza Strip, many of them by air, since the conflict began on 8 July.
 British Airways announces that it is suspending service to Liberia and Sierra Leone through 31 August because of the major Ebola outbreak in those countries.

6 August
 An American unmanned aerial vehicle fires two missiles at a compound in Datta Khel in North Waziristan, Pakistan, killing five Islamic militants.
 The Iraqi government conducts two airdrops of supplies to thousands of starving Iraqis, mostly of the Kurdish Yazidi minority, who are surrounded on Mount Sanjir in northwestern Iraq by Islamic State forces demanding that they convert to Sunni Islam or face execution. For several days, Iraqi government aircraft have been providing air cover for Kurdish pesh merga security forces.
 Iraqi Army aircraft strike a jail in Islamic State-held Mosul. Iraqi officials claim the strike kills 60 Islamic State members and sets 300 of their prisoners at the jail free.

7 August
 President Barack Obama announces that he has authorized the United States Armed Forces to take lethal action against Islamic State forces in Iraq if they threaten the United States Embassy in Baghdad, the United States consulate in Irbil, or the Mosul Dam, or if Iraqi government and Kurdish pesh merga forces are unable to lift the Islamic States siege of Yazidi refugees on Mount Sanjir.
 Three U.S. Air Force military transport aircraft – a C-17 Globemaster III and two C-130 Hercules – escorted by two United States Navy F/A-18 Super Hornets drop 72 bundles of supplies to Yazidi refugees on Mount Sanjir.
 Niger gives the United States permission to open a military unmanned aerial vehicle base at Agadez, Niger.

8 August
 Two U.S. Navy F/A-18 Super Hornets from the aircraft carrier  in the Persian Gulf conduct the first U.S. airstrikes in Iraq since the withdrawal of U.S. ground forces from combat there in December 2011, attacking an Islamic State artillery position in Makhmour with  laser-guided bombs. Later in the day, a U.S. MQ-1 Predator unmanned aerial vehicle armed with AGM-114 Hellfire air-to-surface missiles attacks an Islamic State mortar position, and strikes it again after Islamic State personnel return to the site, and four U.S. aircraft make a nearby attack on a seven-ground-vehicle convoy and another mortar position with laser-guided bombs.
 For a second consecutive day, U.S. military aircraft airdrop supplies to Yazidi refugees on Mount Sanjir.
 After a three-day truce ends, Hamas resumes rocket attacks against Israel from the Gaza Strip. Israel responds with airstrikes that kill at least five people.

9 August
 American military jets and unmanned aerial vehicles conduct four airstrikes against Islamic State forces around Mount Sanjir in northern Iraq, destroying several armored personnel carriers and armed trucks. U.S. military aircraft make a third airdrop of supplies to Yazidi Kurds surrounded on Mount Sanjir by Islamic State forces.
 A missile strike by an American unmanned aerial vehicle kills three members of al-Qaeda in the Arabian Peninsula in Yemens Ma'rib Governorate.
 Israeli airstrikes hit approximately 50 targets in the Gaza Strip, killing five people. One strikes kills two Palestinian militants as they ride a motorcycle through a refugee camp, and another hits a mosque, killing three people including senior Hamas official Moaaz Zaid.

10 August
 Sepahan Airlines Flight 5915, a HESA IrAn-140, crashes just after takeoff from Mehrabad International Airport in Tehran, Iran, killing 39 of the 48 people on board.
 Four strikes by American military jets and unmanned aerial vehicles against Islamic State forces near Irbil, Iraq, destroy three armed vehicles and a mortar position.

11 August
 A Syrian government helicopter attacks the rebel-held Bab Nayrab district of Aleppo with barrel bombs, flattening buildings and killing at least 10 people.
 Ivory Coast becomes the first country to ban all passenger flights from Guinea, Liberia, and Sierra Leone, fearing that airline passengers from those countries will spread the major Ebola outbreak into Ivory Coast, and Nigeria suspends flights by Gambia Bird Airlines until it takes steps to contain the spread of the disease.

13 August
 After a morning exchange of Hamas rocket fire and Israeli airstrikes, the latest truce between Israel and Hamas is extended in the evening for five days. Israeli forces have hit 4,860 targets in the Gaza Strip, mostly via airstrikes, since the conflict began in July.
 A Cessna Citation 560 XLS+ operating as TAM Flight 8220 crashes while attempting to land for the second time in bad weather at Santos Air Force Base in Santos, São Paulo, Brazil, killing all seven people aboard, including Brazilian Socialist Party presidential candidate Eduardo Campos. The plane crashes into two houses and a gymnasium in a residential area of Santos and damages several other houses, injuring at least five people on the ground.
 Eight masked gunmen dressed as ground personnel rob a security van in the cargo area of Comodoro Arturo Merino Benítez International Airport outside Santiago, Chile, stealing 6 billion Chilean pesos (US$ 10.6 million) in cash being transported by plane to banks in northern Chile. It is the largest theft of cash in Chilean history.

16 August
 American military aircraft conduct nine airstrikes against Islamic State forces near the Mosul Dam in Iraq, destroying four armored personnel carriers, one other armored vehicle, seven armed vehicles, and two Humvees.
 Two British aircraft carrying humanitarian aid for Yazidi Kurdish refugees land at Irbil, Iraq.

17 August
 American military aircraft conduct 14 airstrikes against Islamic State forces near the Mosul Dam in Iraq, destroying armored personnel carriers, armed vehicles, Humvees, and an Islamic State checkpoint. These strikes and the ones the day before are instrumental in routing Islamic State forces and enabling Iraqi Army and Kurdish pesh merga forces to capture the dam.
 Two British aircraft carrying humanitarian aid for Yazidi Kurdish refugees land at Irbil, Iraq.
 Syrian government aircraft conduct 84 airstrikes against rebel forces. These include 23 bombing raids against Islamic State forces in the Raqqa Governorate and 20 against Islamic State forces elsewhere in Syria.
 A Northrop Grumman X-47B demonstration unmanned combat aerial vehicle both takes off from and lands aboard the United States Navy aircraft carrier  with approximately 90 seconds of a manned F/A-18 Hornet fighter. It is the first time in history that an unmanned aerial vehicle and a manned aircraft have operated together from an aircraft carrier, and it simulates the operating tempo the X-47B would have to achieve if operating alongside manned aircraft in normal aircraft carrier operations.

18 August
 United States Central Command announces that American aircraft have conducted 68 strikes in northern Iraq since air operations against the Islamic State began on 8 August, and that 35 of them have taken place since 16 August in support of Iraqi and Kurdish ground forces in their successful campaign to capture the Mosul Dam.
 Unidentified jet aircraft strike Tripoli, Libya, targeting Islamist militias and killing six people.

19 August
Later in the week, the United States Department of Defense protests the incident and the People's Republic of China denies any wrongdoing.
 A temporary ceasefire between Hamas and Israel breaks down. Hamas fires rockets into Israel, and Israel responds by striking 25 targets in the Gaza Strip. In one strike, Israeli Air Force F-16 Fighting Falcons fire six missiles at the Gaza City home of Mohammed Yassin Dalu, the reported head of Hamass rocket division, in an attempt to kill Mohammed Deif, the commander of Hamass Qassam Brigades, who the Israelis believe is in the home; they miss Deif, but kill his wife and infant son. Israeli airstrikes also injure 25 people during the day.

20 August
 American aircraft carry out 14 strikes against Islamic State forces near the Mosul Dam in northern Iraq, bringing the total of American airstrikes in Iraq since operations began on 8 August to 84.
 Pro-Russian separatists shoot down a Ukrainian Air Force Sukhoi Su-25 (NATO reporting name "Frogfoot") aircraft near Luhansk, Ukraine.
 The crash of a Guatemalan Air Force Bell 206 helicopter in Guatemala near the border with Mexico kills General Rudy Ortiz, the chief of the Guatemalan joint chiefs of staff, and General Braulio Mayen, commander of the Guatemalan Armys 5th Brigade.

21 August
 Israeli airstrikes in the Gaza Strip kill three senior Hamas commanders in Israels first deliberate targeting of senior Hamas leaders since the beginning of the 2014 Israel–Gaza conflict in early July.
 Egypt and Tunisia halt most commercial flights to and from Libya, citing security concerns.

22 August
 The no-fly zone imposed around Ferguson, Missouri, on 11 August is lifted. Despite the flight ban, police helicopters have been allowed to fly through the zone.

23 August
 An Israeli airstrike strikes the Zafer Tower, a 12-story apartment tower in Gaza City, causing it to collapse completely. Elsewhere in the Gaza Strip, an Israeli airstrike against a car kills one man and injures 11 people. 
 Two more strikes by unidentified aircraft against Islamist targets in Tripoli, Libya, including the Ministry of the Interior building and a warehouse, kill 15 people and injure 20.

24 August
 The Iranian Revolutionary Guard Corps reports that it has shot down an Israeli unmanned aerial vehicle on a reconnaissance mission near Irans uranium enrichment facility at Natanz. Israel does not comment on the claim.
 Islamic State forces capture Tabqa airfield in Syrias Raqqa Governorate after a lengthy campaign.

25 August
 Israeli aircraft strike at least 16 targets in the Gaza Strip, including two mosques, one which Israel claims was used as a weapons storehouse and another than Israel claims was a meeting place for militants. Israeli has conducted about 5,000 airstrikes in the Gaza Strip since fighting began on 8 July.
 The Government of Syria warns the United States not to conduct airstrikes against Islamic State forces inside Syria unilaterally, adding that such strikes would have to be coordinated with the Syrian government.
 United States Government officials announce that the airstrikes in Tripoli, Libya, carried out by unidentified aircraft during the previous week had been secret operations by Egypt and the United Arab Emirates and that the United States had not been consulted about the strikes. Egypt and the United Arab Emirates deny involvement.

26 August
 A ceasefire brings the 50-day 2014 Israel–Gaza conflict to an end. Israeli forces have killed 2,104 Palestinians, the majority of them in airstrikes, in exchange for the death of 69 Israelis and one Thai citizen in Israel.
 After weeks of fierce combat with rival militias, the Islamic Fajr Libya (Dawn of Libya) coalition captures Tripoli International Airport in Tripoli, Libya, and the airliners there belonging to the state-owned Libyan Airlines and Afriqiyah Airways, some of which have been badly damaged or totally destroyed during the fighting. American officials soon say that 11 airliners have disappeared from the airport, and Al Jazeera reports that the stolen aircraft are in the custody of the Masked Men Brigade, which plans to use them in terrorist attacks.
 The United States Government announces that it will not coordinate its operations with the Government of Syria if it decides to launch airstrikes against Islamic State forces within Syria.

29 August
 After Poland and Ukraine deny it access to their airspace, a Russian Tupolev Tu-154 (NATO reporting name "Careless") carrying Russian Minister of Defense Sergei Shoigu on a flight from Slovakia to Russia is forced to turn around and land at Bratislava, Slovakia. Polish authorities explain that they denied overflight rights to the aircraft after it abruptly changed its status from a civilian Aeroflot flight to a military flight without explanation. After the matter is cleared up, Poland gives the plane permission to make its flight, which it does without further incident. The Government of Russia angrily declares the Polish action a "crude violation of the norms and ethics of inter-state conduct", and Shoigu tweets that next time he will make the flight in a Tupolev Tu-160 (NATO reporting name "Blackjack") supersonic strategic bomber.

30 August
 A short series of American airstrikes accompanied by humanitarian aid drops by American, French, British, and Australian aircraft helps break a siege of Shiite Turkmen by Islamic State forces in Amerli, Iraq. It is the second time that American aircraft have intervened directly in ground combat in Iraq since American airstrikes began on 8 August, and American airstrikes in Iraq since that time rise to a total of 118.
 A private Cirrus SR22 on a flight from Waukesha County Airport in Waukesha, Wisconsin, to Manassas Regional Airport in Manassas, Virginia, with only the pilot aboard stops communicating with ground controllers and flies off course into restricted airspace near Washington, D.C. Two U.S. Air Force F-16 Fighting Falcon fighters intercept it and find the pilot slumped over the controls and unconscious. The plane flies out over the Atlantic Ocean and crashes into the sea about 50 nautical miles southeast of Chincoteague, Virginia, when it runs out of fuel.
 In Austin, Texas, an unmanned aerial vehicle (UAV) flies into Darrell K Royal–Texas Memorial Stadium, crammed with 93,000 fans for the season-opening football game between the University of Texas Longhorns and the University of North Texas Mean Green. A University of Texas at Austin student is detained and questioned after he is caught operating the UAV.

31 August
 A small unmanned aerial vehicle flies around Neyland Stadium in Knoxville, Tennessee, packed with 102,000 fans for a football game between the University of Tennessee Volunteers and the Utah State Aggies. The UAV is brought down by security personnel, and the videographer operating it has his press credentials revoked.

September
1 September
 American manned aircraft and unmanned aerial vehicles strike an al-Shabaab camp in Somalia with AGM-114 Hellfire missiles and other munitions, flattening it, destroying a nearby ground vehicle, and killing terrorist leader Mukhtar Abu Zubeyr, more widely known as Ahmed Abdi Godane.

4 September
 Helicopters belonging to a renegade general bomb Benghazi, Libya, attacking ammunition dumps controlled by Islamist militias.

5 September
 Iranian authorities order a flydubai airliner chartered by the United States armed forces and carrying about 100 Americans on a flight from Bagram Airfield in Afghanistan to Dubai to return to Afghanistan due to confusion over the aircrafts flight plan resulting from its departure having been several hours late. When the planes crew reports that it lacks the fuel to fly back to Afghanistan, the Iranians order it to land at Bandar Abbas International Airport in Bandar Abbas, Iran. After the confusion is cleared up, the plane takes off and continues to Dubai, where it lands on 6 September.
 A Syrian government helicopter drops a barrel bomb on a bus station in a rebel-held section of Aleppo, killing at least 15 people.
 A privately owned American Socata TBM700 ceases radio communications an hour into a flight from Greater Rochester International Airport outside Rochester, New York, to Naples Municipal Airport in Naples, Florida, and goes well off course. United States Air Force F-15 Eagle fighters intercept the aircraft and see its unresponsive pilot slumped over the controls and frost on its windows. The plane passes through Cuban airspace and crashes in the Caribbean Sea off the east coast of Jamaica, killing the two people – a husband and wife – on board. Cabin depressurization incapacitating the man and woman is the suspected cause.

6 September
 Syrian government aircraft conduct eight airstrikes against Islamic State-controlled Raqqa, including a government finance building the Islamic State uses as a headquarters and a building it uses as a jail, killing at least 20 civilians and nine Islamic State members. Most of the civilians die when a missile hits the crowded Andalous bakery on a busy street.
 American military aircraft strike Islamic State forces in Barwanah and other towns and villages outside Haditha, Iraq, who are threatening Haditha and the Haditha Dam. The strikes broaden American air operations in Iraq in 2014 to include Al-Anbar Governorate and open the way for an Iraqi ground offensive the following morning.

7 September
 American military aircraft conduct five more strikes against Islamic State forces in the vicinity of the Haditha Dam.
 Syrian aircraft conduct a second day of strikes against Islamic State-held areas in Syria. The death toll from the two days of strikes reaches at least 60, with 41 killed in Raqqa and 19 killed in Deir ez-Zor Governorate.
 American military aircraft carry out two strikes in Afghanistans Kunar Province. One is a precision strike that kills an armed insurgent, while the other is in support of Afghan police and American military ground forces. The following day, Afghan officials claim that the strikes killed 14 people, many of them civilians, and injured 13.

8 September
 Pakistan Air Force aircraft strike three Tehrik-i-Taliban Pakistan hideouts in Datta Khel, North Waziristan, and Pakistani government officials claim 35 insurgents killed in the attacks. Later in the day, Pakistani aircraft strike two more hideouts in the Shawal Valley, and Pakistani officials claim these have killed another 30 insurgents.

14 September
 American fighter and attack aircraft strike Islamic State forces near Sinjar in northern Iraq, destroying six ground vehicles.

15 September
 The United States expands its air campaign against the Islamic State as American fighter and attack aircraft strike an Islamic State fighting position southwest of Baghdad, Iraq, that was firing on Iraqi security forces. It is the first time that the United States strikes Islamic State forces in support of a ground offensive to retake territory. The raid brings the total of American airstrikes in Iraq in 2014 to 162.
 Unidentified aircraft conduct four strikes against arms depots in Gharyan, Libya, killing one person and injuring five others.
 Air Frances pilots begin a strike, prompted by Air France plans to expand its low-cost Transavia brand, demanding that the airline provide the same salary and benefits that they receive to pilots employed by Transavia. Air France refuses on the grounds that such pay and benefits would be incompatible with the low-cost model intended for Transavia. The strike forces Air France to cancel nearly 60 percent of its flights.

16 September
 American aircraft strike Islamic State forces in Youssifiya, Iraq, south of Baghdad.
 Syrian aircraft conduct five strikes against Islamic State forces in Raqqa, Syria. One of the planes crashes outside Raqqa, striking a home and killing at least eight people. The Islamic State claims to have shot the plane down, which would be the first instance of the Islamic State shooting down an aircraft, but some witnesses claim that no noticeable antiaircraft fire occurred before the crash.

17 September
 Pakistani airstrikes against five militant hideouts in Datta Khel, North Waziristan, kill 40 people. The raids also destroy ammunition dumps.
 The world's only two airworthy Avro Lancasters – one from the Royal Air Force's Battle of Britain Memorial Flight and one from the Canadian Warplane Heritage Museum – fly together over Derwent Dam in Derbyshire, England, as a tribute to the RAF's No. 617 Squadron, which practiced there before executing Operation Chastise, its famous "Dambuster" raid, in 1943. It is the first time that two Lancasters have flown over the dam in over 50 years.

19 September
 The University of Michigan cancels plans to use a quadrotor unmanned aerial vehicle to deliver a football to the field at halftime of a football game between the University of Michigan Wolverines and the University of Utah Utes on 20 September at Michigan Stadium in Ann Arbor, Michigan, after the U.S. Federal Aviation Administration (FAA) threatens to sue the university for violating its prohibitions on UAV flights over and in crowded stadiums. The FAA, however, previously had approved flights over the stadium by a number of vintage manned aircraft, and leaves permission for them in place.

23 September
 In the predawn hours, the United States expands its campaign against the Islamic State by striking Islamic State targets in Syria for the first time. United States Air Force B-1 Lancers and F-22 Raptors, United States Navy F-18 Hornets from the aircraft carrier , and American MQ-9 Reaper unmanned aerial vehicles join aircraft from Bahrain, Jordan, Saudi Arabia, and the United Arab Emirates and U.S. Navy Tomahawk sea-launched cruise missiles launched by the guided-missile cruiser  and guided-missile destroyer  in conducting strikes against 22 targets, with about 200 missiles, rockets, and bombs expended. The strikes see the first combat use of the F-22. Aircraft from Qatar play a supporting role. The United States also conducts eight strikes against Khorasan Group targets in Syria, later announcing that the group was poised to carry out a terrorist attack in the United States or Europe. American airstrikes in Syria for the day total 14.
 American aircraft conduct four or five airstrikes against Islamic State targets in Iraq, destroying eight vehicles and hitting Islamic State bases and checkpoints. 
 Israel shoots down a Syrian Air Force Sukhoi Su-24 (NATO reporting name "Fencer") with a Patriot surface-to-air missile after it mistakenly flies over Israeli-occupied territory in the Golan Heights while operating against Syrian rebels. It is the first time in nearly 30 years that Israeli has shot down a Syrian manned attack aircraft. The aircrafts two-man crew ejects safely before it crashes near Quneitra.

24 September
 Military aircraft from the United States, Saudi Arabia, and the United Arab Emirates strike twelve oil refineries in Syria controlled by the Islamic State in an effort to cut revenue the Islamic State earns from oil production. Unidentified aircraft also strike Islamic State forces near Kobane, Syria. American airstrikes for the day total 13, all in Syria.

25 September
 American aircraft conduct 11 strikes against Islamic State targets, all in Iraq. 
 The Federal Aviation Administration announces its approval of the use of unmanned aerial vehicles by six filmmaking companies in the United States, the first exemptions of their kind from its ban on non-recreational UAV use in the country.

26 September
 Warplanes of the United States, Saudi Arabia, and the United Arab Emirates strike Islamic State-controlled oil refineries and Islamic State strongholds in eastern Deir ez-Zor Governorate, Syria, and unidentified aircraft conduct two strikes against Islamic State targets around Kobane, Syria. American airstrikes for the day total seven in Iraq and three in Syria. Since the American air campaign against the Islamic State began on 8 August, the United States has conducted over 200 strikes in Iraq and 43 in Syria.
 The United Kingdom, Belgium, and Denmark authorize their armed forces to conduct airstrikes against the Islamic State on Iraqi territory but preclude their participation in strikes against the Islamic State on Syrian territory.
 A suicidal Federal Aviation Administration contract employee sets a fire in the basement of an air traffic control center in Aurora, Illinois, forcing a halt to all flight operations at airports in the Chicago, Illinois, area for five hours and the cancellation of about 1,950 flights. Commercial air traffic in the United States is disrupted for days afterward, with 770 flights cancelled on 27 September and 800 cancelled on 28 September. On 29 September 400 flights at O'Hare International Airport will be cancelled by noon. Full service is not expected to be restored at the damaged facility until 13 October.

27 September
 About 100 insurgents launch a determined attack against a force of 21 American and 60 Afghan special operations troops dropped into a village in the Kajaki District of Afghanistan's Helmand Province, beginning a fierce, 48-hour battle in which coalition forces conduct 80 airstrikes against the insurgents. By the time the fighting subsides on 29 September, the airstrikes have destroyed 28 vehicles, 17 buildings, and 32 insurgent fighting positions and killed 38 insurgents, while the special operations forces have lost only one man mortally wounded. In all, 48 coalition aircraft – 28 attack helicopters and 20 fixed-wing aircraft – take part in the strikes; participating aircraft types are F-16 Fighting Falcons, AC-130 Spectres, and Boeing AH-64 Apaches, as well as MQ-1 Predator unmanned aerial vehicles.
 American aircraft carry out 10 strikes against Islamic State targets, three in Iraq and seven in Syria.

28 September
 Under increasing pressure from the French government and general public, Air Frances pilots end their 14-day strike, giving up on their attempt to force Air France to provide the same pay and benefits they receive to pilots of its low-cost Transavia brand and freeing the airline to expand Transavias operations. The strike has forced the cancellation of up to 60 percent of Air Frances flights, stranded passengers worldwide, and cost Air France more than 280 million euros ($355 million). Air France plans to begin a progressive return to normal service on 30 September.

29 September
 The United States reports that it has carried out eight airstrikes against Islamic State targets in Syria and three in Iraq during the day. It also reports that it has conducted 222 airstrikes against Islamic State targets in Iraq since beginning them on 8 August and 51 against Islamic State targets in Syria since beginning them there on 23 September. The strikes have hit 10 tanks, 68 other armored vehicles, 124 other armed vehicles, 59 other ground vehicles, eight artillery pieces, 66 fighting positions and posts, 22 weapons and ammunition targets, 15 troop groupings and ground units, and 12 oil refineries. Jet fighter aircraft, attack aircraft including the AC-130 Specter, B-1B Lancer bombers, and unmanned aerial vehicles have conducted the strikes.

30 September
 The United Kingdom conducts its first airstrikes against the Islamic State, as Royal Air Force aircraft assist Kurdish troops under attack by Islamic State forces in Iraq by hitting an arsenal and a ground vehicle with a machine gun mounted on it.
 The United States has conducted 22 airstrikes against Islamic State forces since 29 September 11 in Iraq and 11 in Syria.
 The European Aviation Safety Agency (EASA) issues a type certificate for the Airbus A350-900 airliner, certifying that the aircraft complies with safety and environmental requirements EASA establishes and enforces for the European Union. The A350-900 becomes the first Airbus passenger aircraft with a new design to be entirely certified by EASA, from the application by Airbus in 2007 until the type certification.

October
1 October
The United States Air Force reactivates the Nineteenth Air Force. It had been inactive since July 2012.

2 October
 American aircraft conduct 11 strikes against Islamic State targets, seven in Iraq and four in Syria.

3 October
 American aircraft carry out nine raids against Islamic State targets, hitting three in Iraq and six in Syria.

4 October
 American aircraft strike five Islamic State targets in Iraq and seven in Syria.

5 October
 A missile strike by one or more American unmanned aerial vehicles (UAVs) kills five suspected militants in Pakistans Shawal Valley region in North Waziristan.
 American aircraft carry out strikes against six Islamic State targets in Iraq and three in Syria.

6 October
 The search for Malaysia Airlines Flight 370, missing without a trace since 8 March, resumes in the Indian Ocean after having been suspended on 28 May. The new phase of the search, involving three ships, has the potential to last a year.
 Another missile strike by American UAVs kills another five suspected militants in Pakistans Shawal Valley region. 
 The Government of Ukraine announces that two unarmed UAVs have arrived in Ukraine for use in helping international observers to monitor a ceasefire with pro-Russian separatists.
 Turkey requests that the United States step up its campaign of airstrikes against Islamic State forces in Syria in order to prevent them from taking the city of Kobane.
 American aircraft strike six Islamic State targets, three in Iraq and three in Syria.

7 October
 In Pakistan, three missiles from American UAVs strike a suspected militant training camp in the Shawal Valley area of North Waziristan, killing six people and injuring nine. Later in the day, missiles from American UAVs strike a gathering of militants on a mountain in the Datta Khel region of North Waziristan, killing four people. At least 13 UAV strikes have taken place in Pakistan during 2014, all of them since a resumption of strikes on 11 June after a six-month hiatus.
 The United States conducts five airstrikes against Islamic State forces threatening Kobane, Syria, bringing to ten the number of American airstrikes carried out there since the Islamic State began its offensive against the city. The strikes destroy three ground vehicles and an antiaircraft artillery piece and damage a tank, and one of them forces a convoy of reinforcements headed for Khobane to turn back. American strikes in Syria for the day total nine.
 American aircraft strike four Islamic State targets in Iraq.
 A California Department of Forestry and Fire Protection S-2T tanker aircraft hits a canyon wall and crashes while fighting a forest fire at Yosemite National Park, killing its pilot and prompting the agency to ground its 22 surviving S-2Ts pending an investigation.

8 October
 The Government of Iraq announces that Islamic States forces have shot down an Iraqi military helicopter near Baiji, Iraq, with a shoulder-fired surface-to-air missile, killing both of its crew members. It is the second Iraqi helicopter Islamic State forces have shot down in a week.
 American aircraft strike 14 Islamic State targets, five in Iraq and nine in Syria.
 The United States Government announces that it will begin screening passengers from Guinea, Liberia, and Sierra Leone for the Ebola virus disease when they arrive at John F. Kennedy International Airport in New York City, Newark Liberty International Airport in Newark, New Jersey, Washington Dulles International Airport outside Washington, D.C., O'Hare International Airport in Chicago, Illinois, and Hartsfield–Jackson Atlanta International Airport in Atlanta, Georgia. The five airports between them receive 94 percent of passengers arriving in the United States from the three countries, which are the worst hit by the 2014 Ebola outbreak in West Africa. An estimated 150 arriving passengers will be screened each day. The first screening is scheduled to begin at John F. Kennedy International Airport on 11 October.

9 October
 Coalition aircraft conduct 14 more airstrikes against Islamic State forces mounting an offensive against Kobane, Syria, widening its air campaign there and bringing to 30 the number of airstrikes it has conducted around Kobane during the week. American airstrikes against the Islamic State for the day total five, all in Syria.

10 October
 North Korea and South Korea exchange gunfire across their border after South Korean activists release anti-North Korea propaganda balloons across the border.
 American aircraft have conducted 16 airstrikes against Islamic State forces around Kobane, Syria, since 9 October. American aircraft strike nine Islamic State targets in Syria and one in Iraq during the day.
 The California Department of Forestry and Fire Protection clears its surviving fleet of 22 S-2T tanker aircraft to return to flying firefighting missions after an investigation finds no mechanical flaw responsible for the fatal crash of one of its S-2Ts on 7 October.

11 October
 A missile strike by an American unmanned aerial vehicle against a ground vehicle in the Shawal area of northwestern Pakistan kills two suspected militants. It is the seventh strike in a week and the sixteenth since strikes resumed on 11 June following a six-month hiatus.
 United States Central Command announces that American aircraft have conducted six strikes against Islamic State forces around Kobane since 10 October. The total of American airstrikes against Islamic State targets for the day is three in Iraq and six in Syria.
 John F. Kennedy International Airport in New York City begins the enhanced screening of passengers arriving from Guinea, Liberia, and Sierra Leone for the Ebola virus disease, the first airport in the United States to do so in accordance with the United States Governments 8 October announcement of the enhanced screening program.

12 October
 American aircraft strike Islamic State targets near Hīt, Iraq, destroying an armored personnel carrier and another ground vehicle, but failing to prevent the fall of an Iraqi Army base in Al-Anbar Governorate early the following morning. American airstrikes against Islamic State targets during the day total five in Iraq and four in Syria.
 The United States announces that Turkey has given permission for American forces to strike the Islamic States from bases on Turkish territory, and that it expects to launch such strikes from the United States Air Force Incirlik Air Base.

13 October
 The Government of Turkey denies that it has given the United States permission to launch strikes from its territory against the Islamic State, insisting that the conflict first be widened to include strikes against the Government of Syria.
 American aircraft strike eight Islamic State targets during the day, all in Syria.

14 October
 In response to a Kurdish attack on a Turkish military barracks, Turkish Air Force aircraft strike Kurdish Workers Party targets in Turkey for the first time in nearly two years, hitting at least five targets near Dağlıca. The strikes complicate efforts the United States is leading to get Turkey to join the international coalition opposing the Islamic State's advance against Kurdish forces defending Kobane, Syria.
 American aircraft step up the pace of air attacks against Islamic State forces around Kobane, Syria, conducting 21 strikes that appear to slow the Islamic States's advance against the city. American aircraft also conduct a single strike against Islamic State forces elsewhere in Syria and a single strike against Islamic State forces in Iraq.
 An unmanned aerial vehicle carrying an Albanian flag flies over the field at Partizan Stadium in Belgrade, Serbia, during a Euro 2016 football (soccer) match between Albania and Serbia. The incident results in a brawl between fans and discontinuation of the match.

15 October
 American aircraft strike five Islamic State targets in Iraq and 18 in Syria. Thirty-nine of the 40 American strikes against Islamic State forces in Syria since 14 October have taken place around Kobane.
 The Associated Press reports that Egyptian officials have confirmed that Egyptian Air Force aircraft have bombed Islamist militia positions in Benghazi, Libya, during the day. The Government of Egypt later denies involvement, and Benghazi residents claim that only Libyan Air Force jets flew over the city during the day.

16 October
 Pakistan Air Force jets strike five militant hideouts in the Tirah Valley in the Khyber Agency in northwestern Pakistan, killing at least 21 militants. Prime Minister of Pakistan Nawaz Sharif visits the headquarters of the Pakistan Air Force in Islamabad, Pakistan, and praises the role of the air force in the ongoing campaign against militants in North Waziristan during a meeting with the Chief of Air Staff, Air Chief Marshal Tahir Rafique Butt.
 Enhanced screening of passengers arriving from Guinea, Liberia, and Sierra Leone for the Ebola virus disease expands to include Newark Liberty International Airport, Washington Dulles International Airport, O'Hare International Airport, and Hartsfield–Jackson Atlanta International Airport in accordance with the United States Governments 8 October announcement of the enhanced screening program, ensuring that 94 percent of passengers arriving in the United States from the three West African countries will undergo the enhanced screening.

17 October
 Strikes during the day bring the total of American airstrikes against Islamic State targets in Iraq and Syria combined to 533. General Lloyd J. Austin III, the commander of U.S. Central Command, tells the press that the airstrikes on headquarters, communications equipment, and ground vehicles have disrupted Islamic State operations by forcing the groups forces to travel in smaller groups in civilian vehicles and interfering with its communications and planning capabilities.
 Syrian Air Force aircraft conduct at least five strikes against rebel-held Douma, killing at least 16 people.
 An American airstrike against a natural gas distribution facility in Khasham in Syrias Deir ez-Zor District kills at least eight people, reportedly to be mostly fuel tanker truck drivers. Other strikes during the day target oil wells in the district. 
 Helicopters participate in a search by Swedish military forces for "foreign underwater activity" in Swedens territorial waters in the Baltic Sea after the detection of a Russian-language transmission on an emergency frequency originating from waters in the Stockholm archipelago. The search continues until 24 October, but finds no intruder.

19 October
 For the second time in less than ten days, North Korea and South Korea exchange gunfire across their border after South Korean activists launch propaganda balloons across the border.

19–20 October (overnight)
 Three United States Air Force C-130 Hercules cargo aircraft airdrop 27 bundles of small arms, ammunition, and medical supplies to besieged forces fighting the Islamic State in Kobane, Syria. Islamic State forces seize one of them before the Kurds can take possession of it.

20 October
  French businessman Christophe de Margerie, chairman and chief executive officer of the French oil corporation Total S.A., dies when his corporate Dassault Falcon 50 jet collides on takeoff with a snow plow operated by a reportedly drunk driver and crashes in flames on the runway just before midnight at Vnukovo International Airport in Moscow, Russia, . The other three people on the Falcon – its crew – also die.

21 October
 American aircraft conduct four strikes around Kobane, Syria, destroying Islamic State fighting positions.
 Syrian aircraft drop crude explosives-laden canisters on rebel-held positions on rebel-held Nasib in southern Syria, killing at least eight people.

22 October
 The Government of Syria steps up its attacks against non-Islamic State rebels, conducting 210 airstrikes against rebel-held areas in Aleppo, the eastern suburbs of Damascus, and southern Syria near the border with Jordan between 20 and 22 October. During the strikes, Syrian aircraft drop over 120 barrel bombs. Near Idlib, Syrian aircraft over several days have dropped about 45 barrel bombs on rebel forces threatening two military bases, killing 55 people and wounding more than 100 others.
 A new requirement goes into effect requiring all of the approximately 150 people per day arriving in the United States from Guinea, Liberia, and Sierra Leone to enter the country at one of the five airports conducting enhanced screening of passengers from those countries for the Ebola virus disease. The new requirement had been announced the preceding day. Previously, six percent of passengers from the three West African countries had arrived in the United States at other airports.

23 October
 American aircraft strike Islamic State targets near Kobane, Syria, six times, bringing the number of airstrikes there over the preceding two weeks to 150.
 During the 76-day period since 8 August, American aircraft have conducted 632 airstrikes in Iraq and Syria, dropping 1,700 munitions.

24 October
The jump breaks the previous world record for highest parachute jump of  that Felix Baumgartner set on 14 October 2012. His free fall of  before opening his parachute at an altitude of  sets a new world free fall distance record.
25 October
 Pakistan Air Force jets strike five Islamic militant hideouts in the Khyber Agency in northwestern Pakistan, killing at least 18 militants.

26–27 October (overnight)
 In a secret 20-hour operation, C-130 Hercules transport aircraft and transport helicopters fly the last United States Marines and the last British forces out of Afghanistan. The operation brings to an end an almost 13-year-long United States Marine Corps deployment to Afghanistan that had begun with the onset of the War in Afghanistan in November 2001. British forces also had operated in Afghanistan since 2001.

27 October
 The U.S. Federal Aviation Administration issues a public notice of an update to its longstanding prohibition against flying airplanes over open-air stadiums with a capacity of 30,000 or more, extending the prohibition to unmanned and remotely controlled aircraft.

28 October
 Seven Russian military aircraft, including MiG-31 (NATO reporting name "Foxhound") fighters, make an unusual flight over the Baltic Sea, prompting interceptions by fighter aircraft from Finland, Sweden, and Denmark and by German and Portuguese fighters based in Lithuania. Flights in the area by MiG-31s are unusual.

29 October
 Russian military aircraft conduct three more unusual and provocative flights off the coast of Europe. Seven Russian aircraft, including MiG-31 (NATO reporting name "Foxhound") fighters, again fly over the Baltic Sea, prompting interceptions by Finnish, Swedish, German, Portuguese, and Danish fighters. Four Tupolev Tu-95 (NATO reporting name "Bear") bombers and four Ilyushin Il-78 (NATO reporting name "Midas") tanker aircraft operating with their transponders turned off and without filing flight plans with civil authorities approach Norway, resulting in an interception by Royal Norwegian Air Force F-16 Fighting Falcons, after which two of the Tu-95s press on to fly down the coast of Norway, past Scotland and Ireland – prompting an interception by Royal Air Force Typhoon fighters – and off the coast of Spain and Portugal, where Portuguese F-16s intercept them, before returning to Russia. In the third incident, two Tu-95 bombers and two Sukhoi Su-27 (NATO reporting name "Flanker") fighters fly over the Black Sea and are intercepted by Turkish Air Force fighters. NATO reports that flights of MiG-31s and Tu-95s off Europe are unusual and that the incidents on 28 and 29 October bring the total of interceptions of Russian aircraft by NATO fighters since 1 January 2014 to over 100, triple the rate over the same period in 2013.
 A Latvian civilian Antonov An-26 (NATO reporting name "Curl") cargo aircraft stops communicating with ground controllers in England near London, prompting Royal Air Force Typhoon fighters to intercept it and escort it to a landing at Stansted Airport. The Typhoons create sonic booms heard over Kent.

30 October
 French authorities reveal that since 9 October unidentified unmanned aerial vehicles, some large enough to carry bombs, have made illegal flights over seven French nuclear power plants.
 Departing for Mena Intermountain Municipal Airport in Mena, Arkansas, Beechcraft King Air B200 N52SZ crashes into the FlightSafety International building immediately after takeoff from Wichita Dwight D. Eisenhower National Airport in Wichita, Kansas, after its pilot reports the failure of its left engine. Over 100 people are in the building at the time. The pilot, who is alone in the plane, dies in the crash, which also kills three people in the building and injures five others, one of them critically.

31 October
 Steering with foot pedals, an Australian man taxis a two-seater Beechcraft light plane with its wings removed across Newman, Western Australia, and parks it outside a pub while he goes inside for a drink. He leaves the engine running while he is in the pub, and police cite him for endangering public safety with the planes spinning propeller.
 Since 1 January, North Atlantic Treaty Organization (NATO) forces have scrambled fighter aircraft 180 times to intercept Russian aircraft near Latvia and 132 times to intercept Russian aircraft near Lithuania. During all of 2010, NATO had scrambled aircraft only four times to intercept Russian aircraft approaching Lithuania. 
 With two test pilots on board and using a new fuel mix that had been tested successfully on the ground, Virgin Galactics SpaceShipTwo, the first spaceship designed for space tourism, explodes over the Mojave Desert in California during its fourth test flight and first powered flight since 10 January. The explosion occurs shortly after SpaceShipTwo detaches from its carrier aircraft, White Knight Two, and ignites its rocket engine. SpaceShipTwo breaks into large pieces and crashes, killing one of its pilots, whose body is found in its wreckage, and severely injuring the other, who ejects. The accident is a major blow to the fledgling space tourism industry.

November

2 November
 The Associated Press reports that a no-fly zone the Federal Aviation Administration (FAA) imposed around Ferguson, Missouri, from 11 to 22 August during racial unrest there was intended to exclude press helicopters from filming events in Ferguson. Police helicopters had been routinely exempted from the restriction even though no FAA regulatory authority exists to prohibit press helicopter flights while permitting police helicopter flights.

6 November
 American manned aircraft and unmanned aerial vehicles conduct five strikes against Khorasan Group targets around Sarmada in Idlib Governorate in northwestern Syria near the border with Turkey, targeting a group other than the Islamic State for only the second time since American airstrikes in Syria began on 15 September. United States Central Command announces that the strikes destroyed or severely damaged several Khorasan Group ground vehicles and buildings believed to be meeting and staging areas and training and bombmaking facilities. One strike reportedly hits a ground vehicle in which the Khorasan Groups French bombmaking expert David Drugeon is traveling. Syrian rebels and activists claim that the strikes also targeted the headquarters of Ahrar al-Sham, killing two of its members, and that some of the strikes went astray, killing four children in Harem.

7 November
 American combat aircraft strike a gathering of Islamic State leaders near Mosul, Iraq, completely destroying a convoy of 10 pickup trucks equipped with gun mounts believed to be transporting senior Islamic State commanders.

7–8 November (overnight)
 Airstrikes hit Islamic State targets in Iraqs western al Anbar Governorate, and those around al-Qa'im destroy a ground vehicle and two checkpoints.

8 November
 Aircraft reportedly strike a house near al-Qa'im, Iraq, killing several top aides of Islamic State leader Abu Bakr al-Baghdadi who have gathered there. The nationality of the aircraft conducting the strike is unclear. Rumors arise that Baghdadi himself has been killed or injured in either 7 November raid on Mosul or in this raid.

8–9 November (overnight)
 Syrian Air Force jets and Syrian government helicopters strike Islamic State-controlled al-Bab, Syria. The ten strikes include seven involving barrel-bomb attacks by helicopters and kill at least 21 – and perhaps as many as 30 – people. The strikes also injure at least 85 – and perhaps over 100 – people.

9 November
 A private Learjet 36 executive jet strikes a crane at the Grand Bahama Ship Yard while on approach to Grand Bahama International Airport in Freeport in the Bahamas in heavy rain. It explodes on impact, and crashes into a junk yard below, killing all nine people on board. Myles Munroe, the leader of the Bahamas Faith Ministries, is among the dead.

10 November
 The Iranian Revolutionary Guard Corps claims that earlier in the day it conducted a successful test of a domestic copy of the American RQ-170 Sentinel unmanned aerial vehicle, reverse-engineering it from an RQ-170 captured in December 2011.

11 November
 An American unmanned aerial vehicle strike with two air-to-ground missiles against a compound and a ground vehicle in the village of Dawa Toi in the Datta Khel area of North Waziristan, Pakistan, kills six Islamic militants, wounds three others, destroys the ground vehicle, and damages the compound. It is the eighteenth such American strike in Pakistan in 2014, and the eighth in Datta Khel. All of the strikes have occurred since 11 June.

12 November
 In the Nagorno-Karabakh conflict, the Azerbaijani Armed Forces shoot down an Armenian Mil Mi-24 (NATO reporting name "Hind") attack helicopter, killing all three of its crew members. The Government of Azerbaijan claims that the Mi-24 belonged to the Armenian armed forces and was preparing to attack Azerbaijani military forces in Azerbaijans Agdam District, while the Government of Armenia says that the helicopter belonged to the separatist Nagorno-Karabakh Defense Army (NKR), and both Armenian and NKR officials claim that it was on an unarmed flight and did not enter Azerbaijans airspace.

13 November
 A United States Border Patrol program begun in March 2013 using MQ-9 Reaper unmanned aerial vehicles to monitor remote areas along the border between the United States and Mexico has conducted over 10,000 flights. The Reapers take video of an area, then return again within three days to take more video, allowing analysts to compare the two videos for signs of illegal border crossings during the intervening period. About two percent of the flights have revealed evidence of likely illegal border-crossing activity. The Border Patrol plans to expand the program to the border with Canada by the end of 2015.

14 November
 An American unmanned aerial vehicle fires two air-to-ground missiles against a Khorasan Group target in Harem, Syria, killing between two and 20 people. It is the third U.S. strike against the Khorasan Group. The United States and other coalition members have conducted 20 airstrikes in Iraq and Syria since 12 November, all but three of them against Islamic State targets in and around Kobanî, Syria.

15 November
The ash cloud lies along popular international air routes between Europe, North America, and Asia.

17 November
 A Royal Thai Army Bell 212 helicopter crashes in Phayao Province in northern Thailand, killing all nine people on board. Major General Songphol Thongjeen, deputy commander of the Third Area Army, is among the dead.

18 November
 Syrian military aircraft drop barrel bombs on a rebel-held neighborhood in Syrias Aleppo Governorate, killing at least 14 people and injuring 20.
 In the United States, the National Transportation Safety Board rules that the Federal Aviation Administration has the authority to apply its longstanding regulations against the "reckless or careless use" of aircraft to unmanned aircraft.

22 November
 After about 20 al-Shabaab members hijack a bus in Mandera, Kenya, and murder 28 of the people aboard who are non-Muslim and unable to recite an Islamic creed from memory, Kenya conducts airstrikes against the attackers camp in Somalia, killing 45 al-Shabaab personnel.
 The United Kingdom-based Syrian Observatory for Human Rights, a human rights activist group, reports that airstrikes by the American-led anti-Islamic State coalition in Syria have killed 785 Islamic State personnel, 72 Nusra Front personnel, and 52 civilians since beginning in late 23 September.

24 November
 On the orders of the Operation Dignity coalition in Libya, a MiG fighter aircraft bombs Mitiga International Airport, the only operational civilian airport in Libya after the destruction of Tripoli International Airport during fighting between the Operation Dignity and Libya Dawn factions during the summer of 2014. It drops two bombs, missing the runway and damaging nearby houses, killing at least two people.
 United States Central Command reports that the American-led anti-Islamic State coalition has carried out 24 airstrikes against Islamic State targets in Iraq and Syria since 21 November. In Iraq, 15 strikes have taken place near Mosul, Asad, Baghdad, Ramadi, Tal Afar, and Hīt, hitting Islamic State combat units, buildings, ground vehicles, and checkpoints. In Syria, nine strikes near Ain al-Arab and Raqqa have destroyed three fighting positions and struck staging areas and a headquarters building, with one of the Raqqa strikes killing at least 11 Islamic State personnel. Another strike in Raqqa has destroyed a school for the deaf and mute.

25 November
 An attack from three directions against Iraqs Mosul Dam by Islamic State forces ends when aircraft of the American-led coalition strike Islamic State convoys approaching the dam, killing 30 Islamic State personnel. Senan Meteeb, the Islamic States "emir" for its military forces in the region, is among the dead, killed in a convoy near Hīt.
 Syrian Air Force strikes against Islamic State forces in Raqqa, Syria, kill at least 95 people and wound 120. Some of the wounded are critically injured and not expected to survive.
 The United States and its coalition partners have conducted nearly 870 airstrikes in Iraq and Syria during the campaign against the Islamic State and other Islamic militants. The total does not include airstrikes by Syria, which is not part of the coalition.

26 November
  Inserted by helicopter into a remote region in northern Yemen, United States Navy SEALs and Yemeni special forces rescue eight hostages – six Yemenis, a Saudi, and an Ethiopian – held by al-Qaeda in the Arabian Peninsula (AQAP), but fail to find American hostage Luke Somers and four others they had hoped to rescue. AQAP had moved them to another location prior to the raid.
 United States Central Command reports that American aircraft have conducted seven airstrikes in Iraq since 24 November. The strikes have included one northwest of Ramadi that damaged an Islamic State checkpoint, two near Mosul against a large Islamic State combat unit which destroyed Islamic State fighting position, buildings, and ground vehicles, two near Kirkuk and one near Sinjar which destroyed Islamic State ground vehicles, and one near Baiji which destroyed one Islamic State ground vehicle and damage another.
 The Federal Aviation Administration (FAA) discloses that between 1 June and 19 November, pilots reported 25 mid-air near-collisions with small unmanned aerial vehicles over the United States. Previously, the FAA had reported only a single such incident, which took place on 22 March.

29–30 November (overnight)
 Aircraft of the U.S.-led coalition conduct as many as 30 airstrikes against Islamic State targets in Raqqa, Syria, and the nearby Division 17 air base.

30 November
 An Islamic Republic of Iran Air Force F-4 Phantom II strikes Islamic State targets in Diyala Governorate in Iraq in support of Iraqi troops retaking the town of Sa'adiya from the Islamic State. A video shown by Al Jazeera of the F-4 making a bombing run is the first visual evidence of the involvement of Iranian aircraft engaging in combat in Iraq in the conflict against the Islamic State, although a senior Iranian official later denies Iranian involvement.

December
 Myanma Airways is renamed Myanmar National Airlines.
5 December
 In what becomes known as the "nut rage incident," Korean Air vice president Heather Cho becomes angry with the flight crew of a Korean Air airliner at John F. Kennedy International Airport in New York City after she is served macadamia nuts in a bag instead of on a plate. She fires the chief steward and orders him removed from the plane, delaying the flight by 20 minutes while it returns to the gate so that the steward can disembark. Criticized for her actions, Cho soon resigns, and in January 2015 stands trial for the violation of aviation safety law.

6 December
 V-22 Ospreys carry a team of United States Navy SEALs from the amphibious assault ship  in an operation to rescue two hostages – American Luke Somers and South African Pierre Korkie – from an al-Qaeda in the Arabian Peninsula compound in southern Yemen. Coming under fire, the SEALs suffer no casualties but find the two hostages gravely wounded. The Ospreys evacuate both men to Makin Island, but neither survives.
 Pakistan Army attack helicopters and ground forces attack an Islamic militant hideout in Shinwarsak, South Waziristan, Pakistan, killing three militants, including senior al-Qaeda leader Adnan el-Shukrijumah.

7 December
 Israeli Air Force aircraft bomb targets in Syria, including Damascus International Airport, apparently to strike weapons intended for delivery to Hezbollah in Lebanon. It is the fourth time since early 2013 that Israeli aircraft have struck targets in Syria.

8 December
 An Embraer Phenom 100 business jet on approach to a landing at Montgomery County Airpark stalls and crashes into a house in Gaithersburg, Maryland. The crash kills all three people aboard the aircraft and a woman and her two small children in the house.

10 December
 The Federal Aviation Administration announces that it has granted permission for four more companies to operate unmanned aerial vehicles over the United States, allowing them to fly them on a limited basis for aerial surveying and inspections. It also reports that it will not meet a 30 September 2015 deadline to set the rules for commercial UAV flights over the United States, and that it is unlikely to establish them before 2017 or 2018.

11 December
 Citing an inability of Libya to ensure the safety of the Libyan commercial aviation industry, the European Union bans all seven Libyan airlines – Afriqiyah Airways, Air Libya, Buraq Air, Ghadames Air Transport, Global Aviation and Services Group, Libyan Airlines, and Petro Air – from operating in the airspace of its 28-member countries. The action brings the number of countries banned from flying over European Union countries to 21, and the number of airlines banned to 310.

12 December
 Islamic State forces shoot down an Iraqi Army Eurocopter EC635 with a shoulder-fired rocket launcher at Samarra, Iraq, killing its two-man crew. The incident, which follows the Islamic States success in shooting down two Iraqi helicopters in October, raises fresh concerns about the groups ability to attack aircraft in flight.
 A computer problem at the National Air Traffic Service centre in Swanwick, Hampshire, England, causes widespread flight cancellations throughout the United Kingdom, with London Heathrow Airport and Gatwick Airport particularly affected. The problem is corrected by the afternoon, and service generally returns to normal by 13 December, although 38 flights at London Heathrow are cancelled on the morning of 13 December.

13 December
 According to the Government of Sweden, a Russian military aircraft operating with its transponder turned off comes dangerously close to a Scandinavian Airlines passenger jet over southern Sweden. Swedish Air Force fighters intercept the Russian plane and identify it as an intelligence collection aircraft. Swedish authorities state that it is the second such incident in 2014, the first having occurred in March.

17 December
 Airstrikes by the U.S.-led coalition support a major offensive in Iraq by Kurdish pesh merga ground forces to retake Sinjar from the Islamic State. Two airstrikes near Sinjar destroy two Islamic State ground vehicles. The coalition also conducts eight airstrikes near Mosul and two in Tal Afar.

18 December
 An American unmanned aerial vehicle conducts a strike near Nazyan in Afghanistans Nangarhar Province, killing five suspected Islamic militants.
 The commander of the task force overseeing the U.S-led air campaign in Iraq and Syria against the Islamic State, United States Army Lieutenant General James Terry, informs reporters that he is unaware of any of the airstrikes during the campaign having resulted in civilian casualties.

19 December
 In the aftermath of a 16 December Tehrik-i-Taliban Pakistan attack on the Army Public School in Peshawar, Pakistan, that killed 145 people and injured 114, the Government of Pakistan announces that Pakistani airstrikes in Pakistans northwestern tribal areas begun on 18 December have killed 57 Islamic militants.
 The pilot of an Ethiopian Air Force Mil Mi-35 (NATO reporting name "Hind E") attack helicopter with two other men on board hijacks the helicopter during a training flight and forces it to fly to Eritrea, where the pilot defects. Ethiopias state-run media does not announce the incident until 23 December.

20 December
  Several air-to-surface missiles fired by either an American unmanned aerial vehicle or Pakistan Air Force jets into a compound in the Datta Khel district in North Waziristan, Pakistan, kill at least five Islamic militants.
 In response to a rocket attack against Israeli territory on 19 December, the Israeli Air Force conducts its first airstrike in the Gaza Strip since August, hitting what Israel calls a "Hamas terror infrastructure site" in the vicinity of Khan Younis in the southern Gaza Strip.

21 December
 American military aircraft conduct four airstrikes in Iraq around Sinjar in support of Kurdish and Yazidi troops pushing into the town.

22 December
 In a filing with the United States Patent and Trademark Office, Amazon.com reveals that it is exploring the use of large airships – which it calls "airborne fulfillment centers" – to serve as flying warehouses from which unmanned aerial vehicles will deliver packages and with pinpoint accuracy to customers in public areas and more quickly than is possible with UAVs dispatched from ground bases. The UAVs also could operate more cheaply than ground-based ones because floating or gliding toward the ground and turning their propellers on only for final navigation toward the customer would reduce fuel consumption. The filing will not become public knowledge until December 2016.

23–24 December (overnight)
 The U.S.-led coalition conducts 10 airstrikes against Islamic State targets in Syria and seven against Islamic State targets in Iraq.

24 December
 A Royal Jordanian Air Force F-16 Fighting Falcon crashes during a bombing run against an Islamic State target near Raqqa, Syria, and the Islamic State takes its pilot, Lieutenant Muath al-Kasasbeh, prisoner. Al-Kasasbeh is the first known military member from the international coalition conducting airstrikes against the Islamic State in Iraq and Syria to be captured by the Islamic State. Within 24 hours the United Arab Emirates, fearing for the safety of its pilots, suspends its participation in the air campaign against the Islamic State, demanding that the United States armed forces improve their ability to rescue downed pilots from Islamic State territory – including a specific demand that the United States deploy MV-22 Osprey aircraft for rescue operations – before the United Arab Emirates Air Force returns to the campaign.
 After a sniper in the Gaza Strip fires at an Israeli military patrol across the border in Israel, Israeli Air Force jets strike Hamas military positions in the southern Gaza Strip, killing a Hamas commander and injuring several Palestinians.
 France's La Poste mail service announces that for three months its subsidiary Express Internationale GeoPost has been conducting successful test flights at the civilian UAV testing site at Pourrières of an unmanned aerial vehicle designed to deliver packages to remote parts of the country.

26 December
 A North Atlantic Treaty Organization (NATO) airstrike hits a residence in Aab Josh in the Baraki Barak District of Afghanistan's Logar Province, killing five civilians and wounding six others.
 The Pakistani armed forces announce that airstrikes they conducted during the day in North Waziristan have killed 23 Islamic militants, and that two American unmanned aerial vehicle strikes in the area earlier in the day killed eight militants.

27 December
 The Islamic Republic of Iran Army announces that during a military exercise Iran has flown an unmanned aerial vehicle over the Strait of Hormuz with a 360-degree imaging capability, capable of remaining airborne for 10 hours, and designed to operate as a "mobile bomb," crashing into air, naval, and ground targets under remote control. Iranian sources refer to the UAV both as the "Yasir" and the "Raad." Western military analysts say that the Iranian UAV is a modified version of the American ScanEagle UAV.

28 December
Combined with the loss of Malaysia Airlines Flight 370 in March, the incident sets a record for presumed fatalities aboard missing airliners at the same time in a single year, with 401 people missing and presumed dead aboard the two flights.
 The total of only 20 fatal accidents involving commercial flights carrying 14 or more passengers – including the presumed crash of Indonesia AirAsia Flight 8501 – thus far in 2014 are the fewest in a single year since the Aviation Safety Network began tracking such accidents in 1942.

29 December
 A strike targeting a ground vehicle near Saakow, Somalia, by American unmanned aerial vehicles firing AGM-114 Hellfire air-to-surface missiles kills two al-Shabaab members, including the group's chief of intelligence, Abdishakur Tahlil.

30 December
 After two days of searching, the first bodies and wreckage from Indonesia AirAsia Flight 8501 are discovered in the Karimata Strait.

31 December
 During 2014, U.S. and other international forces have conducted 2,363 airstrikes in Afghanistan.
 According to figures compiled by the Bureau of Investigative Journalism based on press reports, unmanned aerial vehicles conducted 25 attacks in Pakistan during 2014, killing up to 186 people, including two civilians.
 In 2014, American Airlines Group has earned a profit of $2,900,000,000 counting special charges and $4,200,000,000 not counting special charges, both annual profit records. Its profit between 1 October and 31 December of $539,000,000 counting special charges and $1,100,000,000 not counting them – 153% higher than during the same period in 2013 – and both figures are quarterly records.
 The average airline ticket in the United States cost $391 in 2014, the highest average price since the United States Government began tracking air fares in the mid-1990s. Adjusted for inflation, the air fares are at a 12-year high.
 According to the U.S. Federal Aviation Administration, there were 3,894 incidents of lasers striking aircraft flying over the United States during 2014, an increase from 283 during all of 2005.

First flights
 18 February - Cessna Latitude - N3765L 
 9 April – Bombardier Aerospace Learjet 85 - N851LJ.
 11 March – Airbus E-Fan
 2 June – Solar Impulse 2
 26 July – AHRLAC Holdings Ahrlac
 25 September – Airbus A320neo-F-WNEO
 October – AeroMobil s.r.o. AeroMobil Version 3.0
 10 November – Bell 505 Jet Ranger X

Entered service

February
Sukhoi Su-35 (NATO reporting name "Flanker-E") with the Russian Federation Air Force's 23rd Fighter Regiment

Retirements 
McDonnell Douglas MD-11 by KLM
Boeing 747-400 by Air New Zealand
Boeing 747SP by Iran Air
Boeing 737-400 by US Airways
Boeing 747-400 by ANA
Boeing 767-200 by American Airlines

References

 
Aviation by year